= Solar observation =

Study of the Sun's behavior

Solar observation is the scientific endeavor of studying the Sun and its behavior and relation to the Earth and the remainder of the Solar System. Deliberate solar observation began thousands of years ago. That initial era of direct observation gave way to telescopes in the 1600s followed by satellites in the twentieth century.

== Prehistory ==
Stratigraphic data suggest that solar cycles have occurred for hundreds of millions of years, if not longer; measuring varves in precambrian sedimentary rock has revealed repeating peaks in layer thickness corresponding to the cycle. It is possible that the early atmosphere on Earth was more sensitive to solar irradiation than today, so that greater glacial melting (and thicker sediment deposits) could have occurred during years with greater sunspot activity. This would presume annual layering; however, alternative explanations (diurnal) have also been proposed.

Analysis of tree rings revealed a detailed picture of past solar cycles: Dendrochronologically dated radiocarbon concentrations have allowed for a reconstruction of sunspot activity covering 11,400 years.

== Early observations ==
Solar activity and related events have been regularly recorded since the time of the Babylonians. In the 8th century BC, they described solar eclipses and possibly predicted them from numerological rules. The earliest extant report of sunspots dates back to the Chinese Book of Changes, c. 800 BC. The phrases used in the book translate to "A dou is seen in the Sun" and "A mei is seen in the Sun", where dou and mei would be darkening or obscuration (based on the context). Observations were regularly noted by Chinese and Korean astronomers at the behest of the emperors, rather than independently.

The first clear mention of a sunspot in Western literature, around 300 BC, was by the ancient Greek scholar Theophrastus, student of Plato and Aristotle and successor to the latter. The Royal Frankish Annals record that beginning on 17 March AD 807 a large sunspot that was visible for eight days and incorrectly conclude that it was a transit of Mercury.

The earliest surviving record of deliberate sunspot observation dates from 364 BC, based on comments by Chinese astronomer Gan De in a star catalogue. By 28 BC, Chinese astronomers were regularly recording sunspot observations in official imperial records.

A large sunspot was observed at the time of Charlemagne's death in AD 813. Sunspot activity in 1129 was described by John of Worcester and Averroes provided a description of sunspots later in the 12th century; however, these observations were also misinterpreted as planetary transits.

The first unambiguous mention of the solar corona was by Leo Diaconus, a Byzantine historian. He wrote of the 22 December 968 total eclipse, which he experienced in Constantinople (modern-day Istanbul, Turkey):

at the fourth hour of the day ... darkness covered the earth and all the brightest stars shone forth. And it was possible to see the disk of the Sun, dull and unlit, and a dim and feeble glow like a narrow band shining in a circle around the edge of the disk.

— Leo Diaconus

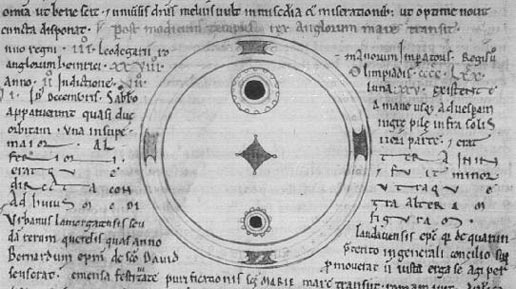
A drawing of a sunspot in the Chronicles of John of Worcester

The earliest known record of a sunspot drawing was in 1128, by John of Worcester.

In the third year of Lothar, emperor of the Romans, in the twenty-eighth year of King Henry of the English...on Saturday, 8 December, there appeared from the morning right up to the evening two black spheres against the sun.

— John of Worcester, The Chronicle of John of Worcester, cited in Albert Van Helden, 1996.

Another early observation was of solar prominences, described in 1185 in the Russian Chronicle of Novgorod.

In the evening there as an eclipse of the sun. It was getting very gloomy and stars were seen ... The sun became similar in appearance to the moon and from its horns came out somewhat like live embers.

— Russian Chronicle of Novgorod

== 17th and 18th centuries ==
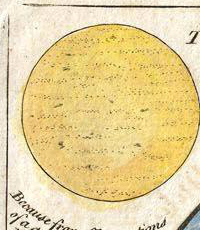
Sunspots in 1794 Samuel Dunn Map

Giordano Bruno and Johannes Kepler suggested the idea that the sun rotated on its axis. Sunspots were first observed telescopically on 18 December 1610 (Gregorian calendar, not yet adopted in England) by English astronomer Thomas Harriot, as recorded in his notebooks. On 9 March 1611 (Gregorian calendar, also not yet adopted in East Frisia) they were observed by Frisian medical student Johann Goldsmid (latinised name Johannes Fabricius) who subsequently teamed up with his father David Fabricius, a pastor and astronomer, to make further observations and to publish a description in a pamphlet in June 1611. The Fabricius' used camera obscura telescopy to get a better view of the solar disk, and like Harriot made observations shortly after sunrise and shortly before sunset. Johann was the first to realize that sunspots revealed solar rotation, but he died on 19 March 1616, aged 26 and his father a year later. Several scientists such as Johannes Kepler, Simon Marius, and Michael Maestlin were aware of the Fabricius' early sunspot work, and indeed Kepler repeatedly referred to it his writings. However, like that of Harriot, their work was otherwise not well known. Galileo Galilei almost certainly began telescopic sunspot observations around the same time as Harriot, given he made his first telescope in 1609 on hearing of the Dutch patent of the device, and that he had managed previously to make naked-eye observations of sunspots. He is also reported to have shown sunspots to astronomers in Rome, but we do not have records of the dates. The records of telescopic observations of sunspots that we do have from Galileo do not start until 1612, for when they are of unprecedented quality and detail as by then he had developed the telescope design and greatly increased its magnification. Likewise Christoph Scheiner had probably been observing the spots using an improved helioscope of his own design. Galileo and Scheiner, neither of whom knew of the work of Harriot or Fabricius vied for the credit for the discovery. In 1613, in Letters on Sunspots, Galileo refuted Scheiner's 1612 claim that sunspots were planets inside Mercury's orbit, showing that sunspots were surface features.

Although the physical aspects of sunspots were not identified until the 20th century, observations continued. Study was hampered during the 17th century due to the low number of sunspots during what is now recognized as an extended period of low solar activity, known as the Maunder Minimum. By the 19th century, then-sufficient sunspot records allowed researchers to infer periodic cycles in sunspot activity. In 1845, Henry and Alexander observed the Sun with a thermopile and determined that sunspots emitted less radiation than surrounding areas. The emission of higher than average amounts of radiation later were observed from the solar faculae. Sunspots had some importance in the debate over the nature of the Solar System. They showed that the Sun rotated, and their comings and goings showed that the Sun changed, contrary to Aristotle, who had taught that all celestial bodies were perfect, unchanging spheres.

Sunspots were rarely recorded between 1650 and 1699. Later analysis revealed the problem to be a reduced number of sunspots, rather than observational lapses. Building upon Gustav Spörer's work, the wife-and-husband team of Annie Maunder and Edward Maunder suggested that the Sun had changed from a period in which sunspots all but disappeared to a renewal of sunspot cycles starting in about 1700. Adding to this understanding of the absence of solar cycles were observations of aurorae, which were absent at the same time, except at the very highest magnetic latitudes

The lack of a solar corona during solar eclipses was also noted prior to 1715.

The period of low sunspot activity from 1645 to 1717 later became known as the "Maunder Minimum". Observers such as Johannes Hevelius, Jean Picard and Jean Dominique Cassini confirmed this change.

== 19th century ==
=== Solar spectroscopy ===
After the detection of infra-red radiation by William Herschel in 1800 and of Ultraviolet radiation by Johann Wilhelm Ritter, solar spectrometry began in 1817 when William Hyde Wollaston noticed that dark lines appeared in the solar spectrum when viewed through a glass prism. Joseph von Fraunhofer later independently discovered the lines and they were named Fraunhofer lines after him. Other physicists discerned that properties of the solar atmosphere could be determined from them. Notable scientists to advance spectroscopy were David Brewster, Gustav Kirchhoff, Robert Wilhelm Bunsen and Anders Jonas Ångström.

=== Solar cycle ===
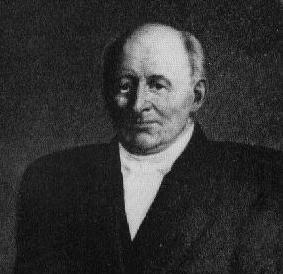
Samuel Heinrich Schwabe (1789–1875). German astronomer, discovered the solar cycle through extended observations of sunspots

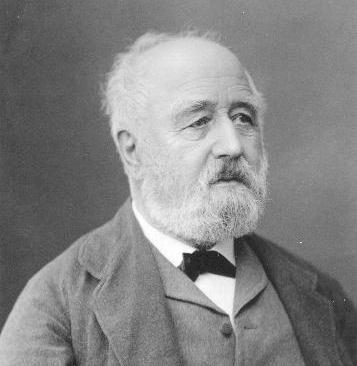
Rudolf Wolf (1816–1893), Swiss astronomer, carried out historical reconstruction of solar activity back to the seventeenth century

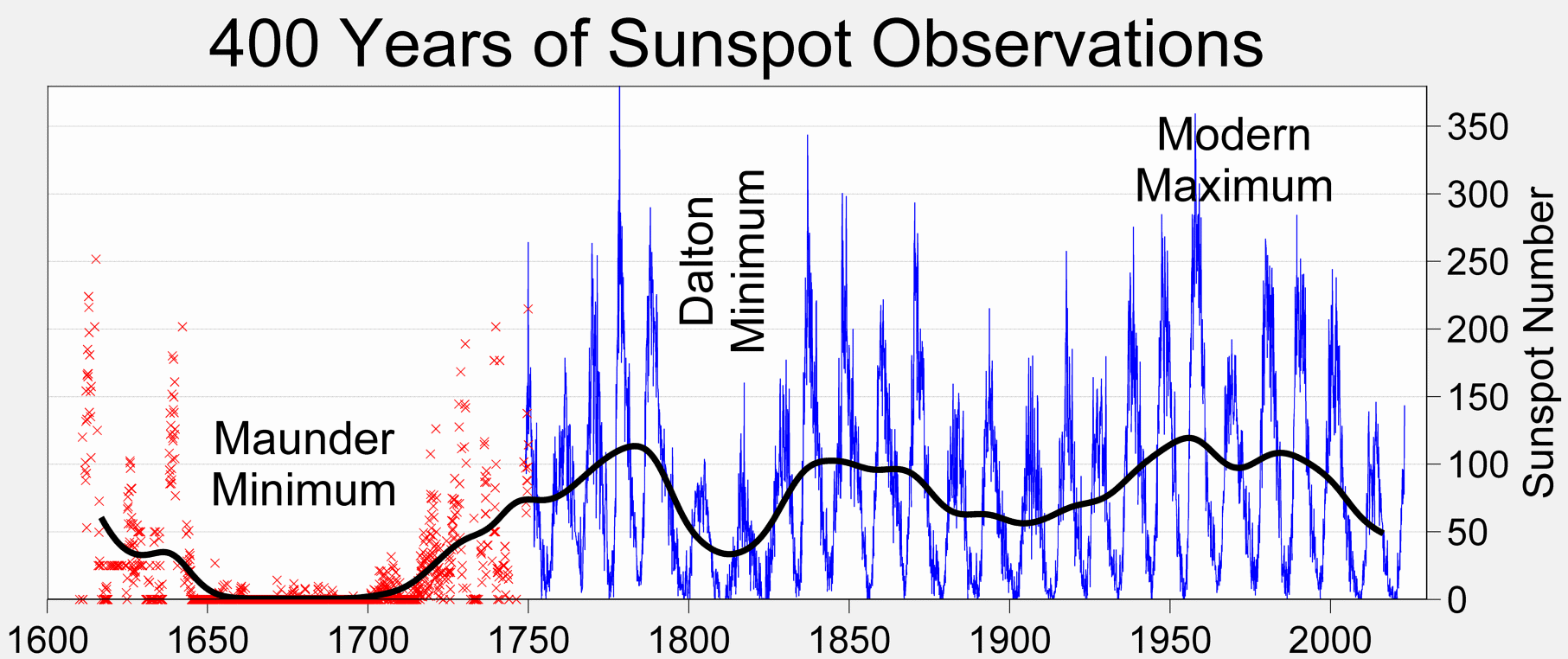
400 year history of sunspot numbers.

The cyclic variation of the number of sunspots was first observed by Samuel Heinrich Schwabe between 1826 and 1843. Rudolf Wolf studied the historical record in an attempt to establish a history of solar variations. His data extended only to 1755. He also established in 1848 a relative sunspot number formulation to compare the work of different astronomers using varying equipment and methodologies, now known as the Wolf (or Zürich) sunspot number.

Gustav Spörer later suggested a 70-year period before 1716 in which sunspots were rarely observed as the reason for Wolf's inability to extend the cycles into the 17th century.

Also in 1848, Joseph Henry projected an image of the Sun onto a screen and determined that sunspots were cooler than the surrounding surface.

Around 1852, Edward Sabine, Wolf, Jean-Alfred Gautier and Johann von Lamont independently found a link between the solar cycle and geomagnetic activity, sparking the first research into interactions between the Sun and the Earth.

In the second half of the nineteenth century Richard Carrington and Spörer independently noted the migration of sunspot activity towards the solar equator as the cycle progresses. This pattern is best visualized in the form of the so-called butterfly diagram, first constructed by Edward Walter Maunder and Annie Scott Dill Maunder in the early twentieth century (see graph). Images of the Sun are divided into latitudinal strips, and the monthly-averaged fractional surface of sunspots calculated. This is plotted vertically as a color-coded bar, and the process is repeated month after month to produce a time-series diagram.

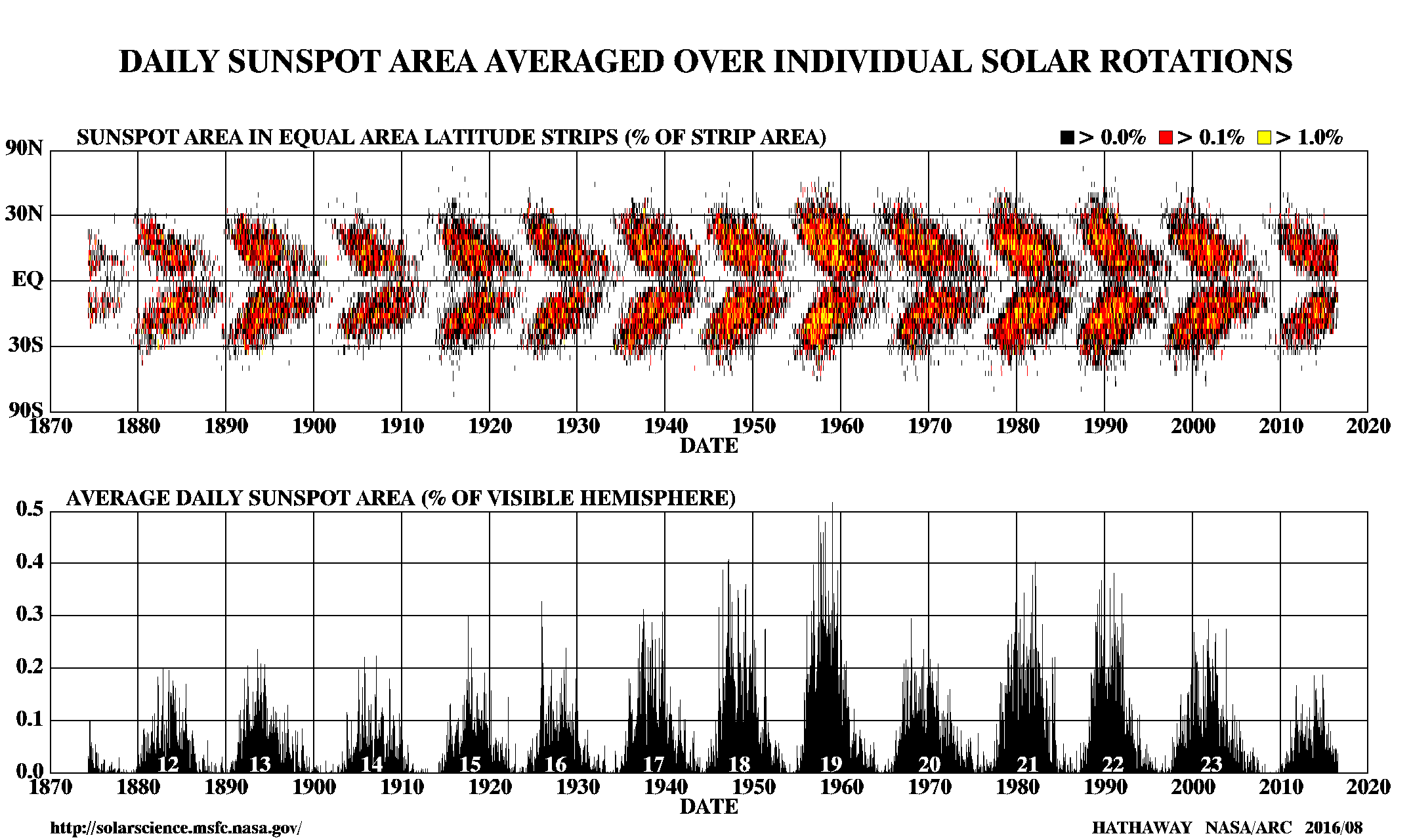
The sunspot butterfly diagram. This modern version is constructed (and regularly updated) by the solar group at NASA Marshall Space Flight Center.

Half a century later, the father-and-son team of Harold and Horace Babcock showed that the solar surface is magnetized even outside of sunspots; that this weaker magnetic field is to first order a dipole; and that this dipole undergoes polarity reversals with the same period as the sunspot cycle (see graph below). These observations established that the solar cycle is a spatiotemporal magnetic process unfolding over the Sun as a whole.

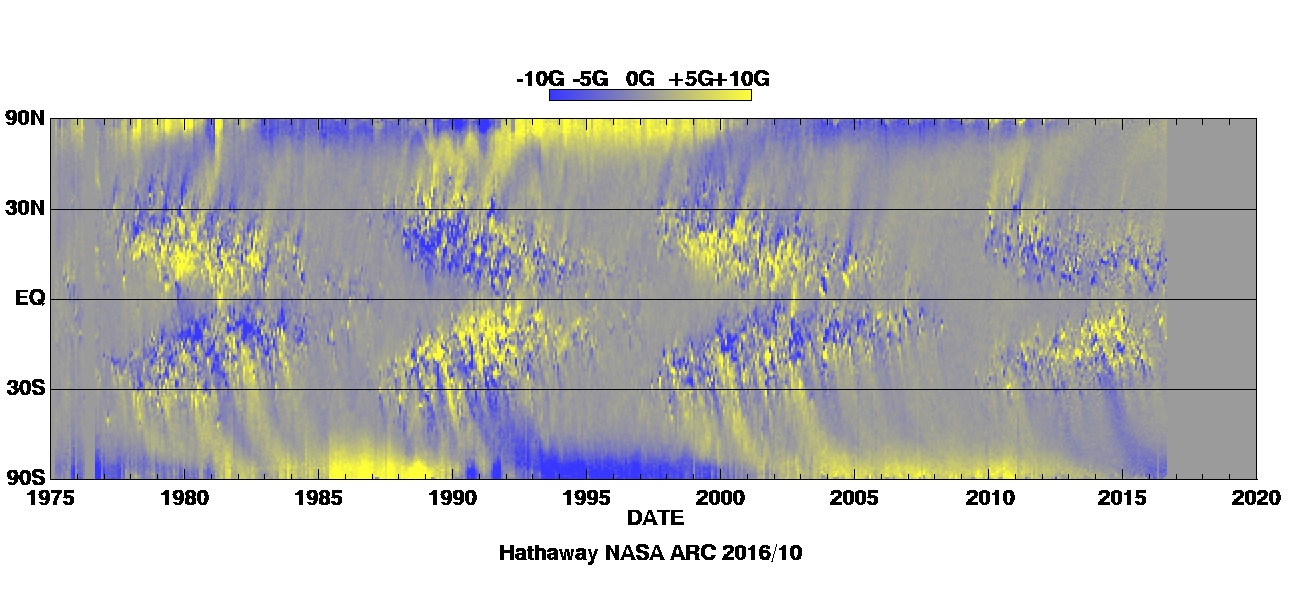
Time vs. solar latitude diagram of the radial component of the solar magnetic field, averaged over successive solar rotation. The "butterfly" signature of sunspots is clearly visible at low latitudes. Diagram constructed (and regularly updated) by the solar group at NASA Marshall Space Flight Center.

=== Photography ===
The Sun was photographed for the first time, on 2 April 1845, by French physicists Louis Fizeau and Léon Foucault. Sunspots, as well as the limb darkening effect, are visible in their daguerrotypes. Photography assisted in the study of solar prominences, granulation and spectroscopy. Charles A. Young first captured a prominence in 1870. Solar eclipses were also photographed, with the most useful early images taken in 1851 by Berkowski and in 1860 by De la Rue's team in Spain.

=== Rotation ===
Early estimates of the Sun's rotation period varied between 25 and 28 days. The cause was determined independently in 1858 by Richard C. Carrington and Spörer. They discovered that the latitude with the most sunspots decreases from 40° to 5° during each cycle, and that at higher latitudes sunspots rotate more slowly. The Sun's rotation was thus shown to vary by latitude and that its outer layer must be fluid. In 1871 Hermann Vogel, and shortly thereafter by Charles Young confirmed this spectroscopically. Nils Dúner's spectroscopic observation in the 1880s showed a 30% difference between the Sun's faster equatorial regions and its slower polar regions.

=== Space weather ===
The first modern, and clearly described, accounts of a solar flare and coronal mass ejection occurred in 1859 and 1860 respectively. On 1 September 1859, Richard C. Carrington, while observing sunspots, saw patches of increasingly bright light within a group of sunspots, which then dimmed and moved across that area within a few minutes. This event, also reported by R. Hodgson, is a description of a solar flare. The widely viewed total solar eclipse on 18 July 1860 resulted in many drawings, depicting an anomalous feature that corresponds with modern CME observations.

For many centuries, the earthly effects of solar variation were noticed but not understood. E.g., displays of auroral light have long been observed at high latitudes, but were not linked to the Sun.

In 1724, George Graham reported that the needle of a magnetic compass was regularly deflected from magnetic north over the course of each day. This effect was eventually attributed to overhead electric currents flowing in the ionosphere and magnetosphere by Balfour Stewart in 1882, and confirmed by Arthur Schuster in 1889 from analysis of magnetic observatory data.

In 1852, astronomer and British major general Edward Sabine showed that the probability of the occurrence of magnetic storms on Earth was correlated with the number of sunspots, thus demonstrating a novel solar-terrestrial interaction. In 1859, a great magnetic storm caused brilliant auroral displays and disrupted global telegraph operations. Richard Carrington correctly connected the storm with a solar flare that he had observed the day before in the vicinity of a large sunspot group—thus demonstrating that specific solar events could affect the Earth.

Kristian Birkeland explained the physics of aurora by creating artificial aurora in his laboratory and predicted the solar wind.

== 20th century ==
=== Observatories ===
Early in the 20th century, interest in astrophysics grew in America, and multiple observatories were built. Solar telescopes (and thus, solar observatories), were installed at Mount Wilson Observatory in California in 1904, and in the 1930s at McMath–Hulbert Observatory. Interest also grew in other parts of the world, with the establishment of the Kodaikanal Solar Observatory in India at the turn of the century, the Einsteinturm in Germany in 1924, and the Solar Tower Telescope at the National Observatory of Japan in 1930.

Around 1900, researchers began to explore connections between solar variations and Earth's weather. Smithsonian Astrophysical Observatory (SAO) assigned Abbot and his team to detect changes in the radiation of the Sun. They began by inventing instruments to measure solar radiation. Later, when Abbot was SAO head, they established a solar station at Calama, Chile to complement its data from Mount Wilson Observatory. He detected 27 harmonic periods within the 273-month Hale cycles, including 7, 13, and 39-month patterns. He looked for connections to weather by means such as matching opposing solar trends during a month to opposing urban temperature and precipitation trends. With the advent of dendrochronology, scientists such as Glock attempted to connect variation in tree growth to periodic solar variations and infer long-term secular variability in the solar constant from similar variations in millennial-scale chronologies.

=== Coronagraph ===
Until the 1930s, little progress was made on understanding the Sun's corona, as it could only be viewed during infrequent total solar eclipses. Bernard Lyot's 1931 invention of the Coronagraph – a telescope with an attachment to block out the direct light of the solar disk – allowed the corona to be studied in full daylight.

=== Spectroheliograph ===
American astronomer George Ellery Hale, as an MIT undergraduate, invented the spectroheliograph, with which he made the discovery of solar vortices. In 1908, Hale used a modified spectroheliograph to show that the spectra of hydrogen exhibited the Zeeman effect whenever the area of view passed over a sunspot on the solar disc. This was the first indication that sunspots were basically magnetic phenomena, which appeared in opposite polarity pairs. Hale's subsequent work demonstrated a strong tendency for east-west alignment of magnetic polarities in sunspots, with mirror symmetry across the solar equator; and that the magnetic polarity for sunspots in each hemisphere switched orientation from one solar cycle to the next. This systematic property of sunspot magnetic fields is now commonly referred to as the Hale–Nicholson law, or in many cases simply Hale's laws.

=== Solar radio bursts ===
The introduction of radio revealed periods of extreme static or noise. Severe radar jamming during a large solar event in 1942 led to the discovery of solar radio bursts.

=== Satellites ===
Many satellites in Earth orbit or in the heliosphere have deployed solar telescopes and instruments of various kinds for in situ measurements of particles and fields. Skylab, a notable large solar observational facility, grew out if the impetus of the International Geophysical Year campaign and the facilities of NASA. Other spacecraft, in an incomplete list, have included the OSO series, the Solar Maximum Mission, Yohkoh, SOHO, ACE, TRACE, and SDO among many others; still other spacecraft (such as MESSENGER, Fermi, and NuSTAR) have contributed solar measurements by individual instruments.

Modulation of solar bolometric radiation by magnetically active regions, and more subtle effects, was confirmed by satellite measurements of the total solar irradiance (TSI) by the ACRIM1 experiment on the Solar Maximum Mission (launched in 1980). The modulations were later confirmed in the results of the ERB experiment launched on the Nimbus 7 satellite in 1978. Satellite observation was continued by ACRIM-3 and other satellites.

=== Measurement proxies ===
Direct irradiance measurements have been available during the last three cycles and are a composite of multiple observing satellites. However, the correlation between irradiance measurements and other proxies of solar activity make it reasonable to estimate solar activity for earlier cycles. Most important among these proxies is the record of sunspot observations that has been recorded since ~1610. Solar radio emissions at 10.7 cm wavelength provide another proxy that can be measured from the ground, since the atmosphere is transparent to such radiation.

Other proxy data – such as the abundance of cosmogenic isotopes – have been used to infer solar magnetic activity, and thus likely brightness, over several millennia.

Total solar irradiance has been claimed to vary in ways that are not predicted by sunspot changes or radio emissions. These shifts may be the result of inaccurate satellite calibration. A long-term trend may exist in solar irradiance.

=== Other developments ===
The Sun was, until the 1990s, the only star whose surface had been resolved. Other major achievements included understanding of:

- X-ray-emitting loops
- Corona and solar wind
- Variance of solar brightness with level of activity and verification of this effect in other solar-type stars
- The intense Fibril state of the magnetic fields at the visible surface of a star like the sun
- The presence of magnetic fields of 0.5×10^{5} to 1×10^{5} gauss at the base of the conductive zone, presumably in some fibril form, inferred from the dynamics of rising azimuthal flux bundles.
- Low-level Electron neutrino emission from the Sun's core.

== 21st century ==
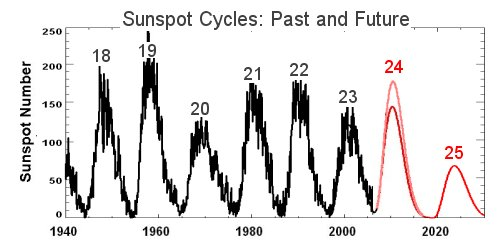
Nasa's 2006 prediction. At 2010/2011, the sunspot count was expected to be at its maximum, but in reality in 2010 it was still at its minimum.

The most powerful flare observed by satellite instrumentation began on 4 November 2003 at 19:29 UTC, and saturated instruments for 11 minutes. Region 486 has been estimated to have produced an X-ray flux of X28. Holographic and visual observations indicate significant activity continued on the far side of the Sun.

Sunspot and infrared spectral line measurements made in the latter part of the first decade of the 2000s suggested that sunspot activity may again be disappearing, possibly leading to a new minimum. From 2007 to 2009, sunspot levels were far below average. In 2008, the Sun was spot-free 73 percent of the time, extreme even for a solar minimum. Only 1913 was more pronounced, with no sunspots for 85 percent of that year. The Sun continued to languish through mid-December 2009, when the largest group of sunspots to emerge for several years appeared. Even then, sunspot levels remained well below those of recent cycles.

In 2006, NASA predicted that the next sunspot maximum would reach between 150 and 200 around the year 2011 (30–50% stronger than cycle 23), followed by a weak maximum at around 2022. Instead, the sunspot cycle in 2010 was still at its minimum, when it should have been near its maximum, demonstrating its unusual weakness.

Cycle 24's minimum occurred around December 2008 and the next maximum was predicted to reach a sunspot number of 90 around May 2013. The monthly mean sunspot number in the northern solar hemisphere peaked in November 2011, while the southern hemisphere appears to have peaked in February 2014, reaching a peak monthly mean of 102. Subsequent months declined to around 70 (June 2014). In October 2014, sunspot AR 12192 became the largest observed since 1990. The flare that erupted from this sunspot was classified as an X3.1-class solar storm.

Independent scientists of the National Solar Observatory (NSO) and the Air Force Research Laboratory (AFRL) predicted in 2011 that Cycle 25 would be greatly reduced or might not happen at all.
