= Map of the World =

Map of the World or A Map of the World may refer to:

- World map, a map of most or all of the surface of the Earth
- A Map of the World, 1994 novel by Jane Hamilton
  - A Map of the World (film), 1999 film drama directed by Scott Elliott and based on the novel of the same name by Jane Hamilton
  - A Map of the World (album), 1999 album by Pat Metheny and soundtrack of the movie A Map of the World
- "Map of the World (Part II)", song by the Canadian singer/songwriter Jane Siberry from her 1985 album The Speckless Sky
- "Map of the World", a 2010 song by Plain White T's from Wonders of the Younger

== See also ==
- A General Map of the World, or Terraqueous Globe
- Babylonian Map of the World
- International Map of the World
