= Geosolar cycle =

A Geosolar cycle is a repetitive interaction between earth and the sun. It may refer to:

- Solar activity and climate, variability in solar output
- Solar cycle, an 11-year cycle of sunspot and energy output
- Axial precession (Lunisolar precession), a 21,000 year cycle in the orientation of earth relative to the sun
- Precession of the ecliptic, a 41,000 year cycle in axial precession
- Milankovitch cycles, a roughly 100,000 year cycle in the Earth's climate
