= John A. Eddy =

American astronomer

John Allen Eddy
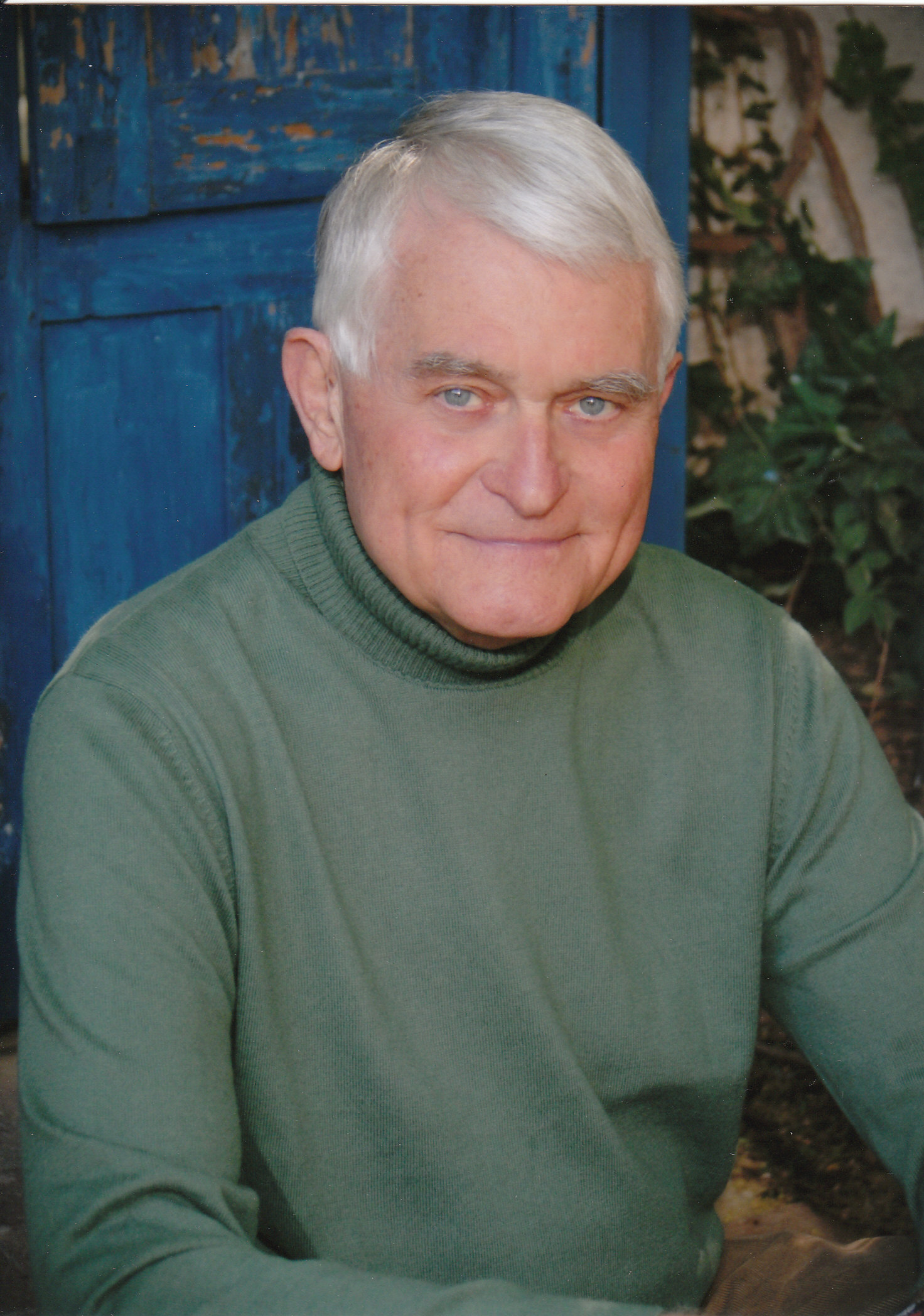
- John A. Eddy
- Born: March 25, 1931; Pawnee City, Nebraska, United States
- Died: June 10, 2009 (aged 78); Tucson, Arizona, United States
- Education: US Naval Academy, University of Colorado
- Awards: Arctowski Medal (1987); National Academy of Sciences (1987)
- Scientific career
- Fields: Solar Physics
- Doctoral advisor: Gordon Newkirk

John Allen "Jack" Eddy (March 25, 1931 – June 10, 2009) was an American astronomer. He studied historical sunspot records, and popularised the name Maunder Minimum for the sunspot minimum which occurred in the late 17th century.

== Childhood and education ==
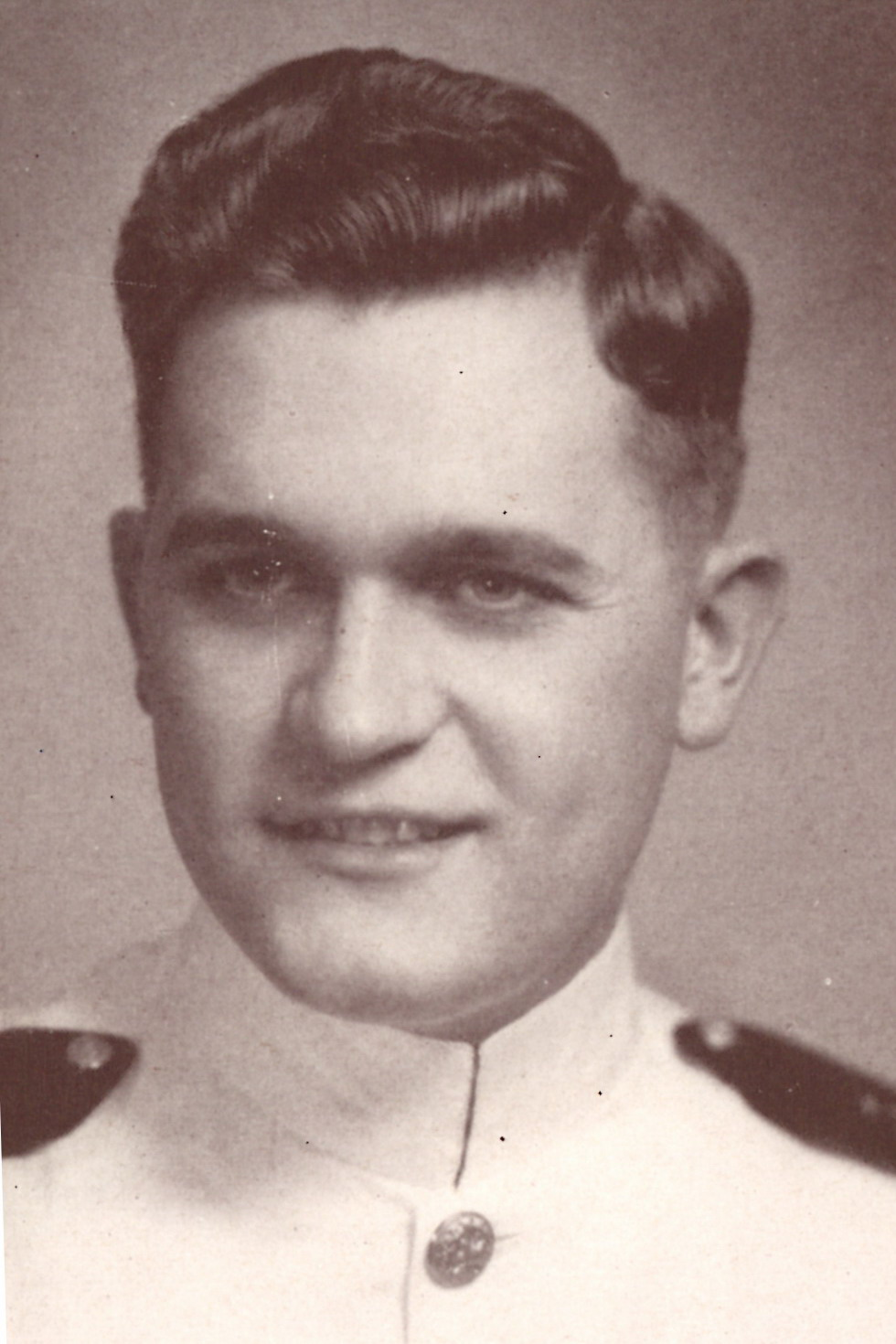
Midshipman John Allen Eddy, U.S. Naval Academy Class of 1953.

John Eddy was born and raised in Pawnee City, Nebraska. His brother Robert was two years his senior and his sister Lucille was two years his younger. His father managed a cooperative farm store where John worked until he started high school. John's mother had attained college for one year and was a county schoolteacher until she married his father. The Eddy family were of limited economic means and were concerned that they could not afford a college education for John. As it turned out, he was the only member of the family to graduate from college. In 1948, he attended Doane College in Crete, Nebraska for one year, a distance of some 80 miles (130 km) from his home. In 1949 he was appointed by Senator Kenneth Wherry of Nebraska, who also resided in Pawnee City, to the U.S. Naval Academy. At Annapolis, there were few science courses but Eddy attended a course in celestial navigation, which gave him a love of the sky. So great was his interest in the night sky that once after Taps, he crawled out on the roof of Bancroft Hall to look for the Constellation Draco and was caught by an officer who gave him five hours of extra duty for not being in bed.

Upon graduation in 1953 from the United States Naval Academy, Eddy served for four years at sea as a line officer on aircraft carriers during the Korean War and later in the Persian Gulf as navigator and operations officer on a destroyer in the Atlantic Fleet. In 1957, he left active service in the Navy to continue his education. He was discharged and accepted into the graduate school at the University of Colorado's mathematics program, but switched departments before the start of the 1957 Fall semester, upon discovering the University's observatory and a program in astro-geophysics that had just been started, becoming the program's first student. Later, he joined the High Altitude Observatory at the University of Colorado.

== Academic career ==
As a protege of Gordon Newkirk, Eddy worked with Princeton Professor Martin Schwarzschild in studying the solar corona with coronagraphs mounted on stratospheric balloons at altitudes of 80,000 feet (24,000 m). Eddy completed his PhD Thesis at the University of Colorado at Boulder in December 1961 titled "The Stratospheric Solar Aureole". After obtaining his PhD, Eddy went into teaching, while maintaining an active research schedule to maintain his credentials. He studied spectral lines and worked on infrared spectroscopy.

== Interdisciplinary work ==
Eddy received much criticism from within the astronomy community for his interdisciplinary work on Native American medicine wheels, which showed how they were used as calendars and observatories. It also earned him criticism from archaeologists at first, although his work was eventually accepted, and later documented in National Geographic and as a guest on TV and radio programs.

As a teacher, he frequently used historical examples to show his students that not so long ago nobody knew more than they did about solar physics. This led him to do a lot of research in the history of his own field, particularly covering records of past eclipses and sunspot counts, whereupon he discovered the records of Edward Maunder and others demonstrating that there was indeed long term variability in solar activity. Eugene Parker of the University of Chicago, when promoting his theory of the existence of a solar wind, exposed Eddy to Maunder's work on sunspot records.

== Solar minimum paper ==
In 1976, Eddy published a paper in Science titled "The Maunder Minimum" where, using the nineteenth century works of Edward W. Maunder and Gustav Spörer, he identified a 70-year period from 1645 to 1715 in which solar activity was extremely low. In making the case for the anomaly, he gathered and interpreted data from a wide variety of sources, including first-hand accounts from extant historical observations of the Sun going back to the telescopic observations of Galileo and other contemporary scientists of the 17th and early 18th centuries; from historical reports of the aurora borealis observed in past centuries in Europe and the New World; from visual observations of sunspots seen with the unaided eye at sunrise and sunset in dynastic records from the Orient; from existing descriptions of the eclipsed Sun; and from measurements of carbon-14 in dated tree-rings. In the last of these, which can be used as a proxy indicator of solar activity, he found evidence of other similar periods of solar quiescence in the distant past, the most recent an even longer 90-year span, from about 1460 until 1550, which he named the Spörer Minimum.

Both the Maunder and Spörer minima fell during the coldest parts of the Little Ice Age, which suggested a connection between the longer term behavior of the Sun and of the Earth's mean surface temperature. In advancing the theory that the Sun is a variable star, Eddy wrote that: "It has long been thought that the Sun is a constant star of regular and repeatable behavior. Measurements of the radiative output, or solar constant, seem to justify the first assumption, and the record of periodicity in sunspot numbers is taken as evidence of the second. Both records, however, sample only the most recent history of the Sun."

== Post-academia ==
Eddy was laid off from the High Altitude Observatory at the National Center for Atmospheric Research (NCAR) in 1973 due to budget cutbacks and the poor performance reviews he earned due to his interdisciplinary forays, which were frowned upon at the time. He then was hired by NASA to write a book, which enabled him to travel east to do research in the great astronomy libraries, particularly at Harvard and the Naval Observatory, which he used to also do research on the Maunder Minimum. His work on this was published in the journal Science as a cover story. After publication, his former employers at the HAO tried to hire him back. The interest resulting from "The Maunder Minimum" paper saw him giving over 50 talks a year around the world about his work and history.

In 1987, Eddy was awarded the Arctowski Medal by the National Academy of Sciences for studies in solar physics and solar-terrestrial relationships and specifically for "his demonstration of the existence and nature of solar variations of long term and the consequences of these changes for climate and for mankind."

== Death ==
Eddy died of cancer at his home in Tucson, Arizona on June 10, 2009.

== Legacy ==
NASA, along with the Cooperative Programs for the Advancement of Earth System Science (CPAESS) and the University Corporation for Atmospheric Research (UCAR) offer the Jack Eddy Postdoctoral Fellowship in his honor. The two-year fellowship matches early career PhDs with experienced scientists at various US institutions.

== Honors ==
- Fellow, American Association for the Advancement of Science, 1988.
- Arctowski Medal in Solar and Solar-Terrestrial Physics, National Academy of Sciences, 1987
- Visiting Scientist, University of Durham, England, 1985, 1987.
- James Arthur Prize Lecture in Solar and Solar Terrestrial Physics, Center for Astrophysics | Harvard & Smithsonian, 1983.
- Research Fellow, National Geographic Society, 1975-1976.
- NCAR Award for Outstanding Performance in New Technology, 1973.
- Sigma Xi-RESA Boulder Scientist Award, 1965.
- National Academy of Sciences/National Research Council Post-Doctoral Fellow, 1962-1963.

== Books ==
- The New Solar Physics (Editor) Westview Press. 1978, 214 pp, ISBN 0-89158-444-7.
- A New Sun (The Solar Results from Skylab) NASA SP-402, U.S. Government Printing Office, 1979. 198 pp.
- The Ancient Sun (Co-Editor, with R.O. Pepin and R.B. Merrill) Pergamon Press, 1980, 581 pp, ISBN 0-08-026324-0.
- Mapping the Sky (Co-Editor, with S. DeBarbat, H.K. Eichhom and A.R. Upgren) Kluwer Academic Publishers, 1988, 512 pp, ISBN 90-277-2809-7.
- Global Changes in the Perspective of the Past (Co-Editor, with H. Oeschger) John Wiley & Sons, Chichester, 1993, 383 pp., ISBN 0-471-93603-0.
- The Sun, the Earth and Near-Earth Space: A Guide to the Sun-Earth System; NASA NP-2009-1-066-GSFC, U.S., 2009, 311 pp, ISBN 0160838088.

== See also ==
- Solar variation
- Climate change
- Maunder Minimum
- Spörer Minimum
