= 2024 solar storms =

Solar and geomagnetic storm activity during 2024

The year 2024 was marked by elevated solar activity associated with solar cycle 25, including several major coronal mass ejections (CMEs) and geomagnetic storms that produced aurorae visible at unusually low latitudes.

== Background ==
Solar activity in 2024 occurred during the peak phase of solar cycle 25, which began in December 2019. By early 2024, sunspot counts and solar flux reached their highest levels since 2014.

== Major events ==
=== January ===
- 22–23 January: A series of M-class solar flares triggered minor geomagnetic disturbances (G1–G2).

=== May ===
- 7–11 May: A cluster of X-class flares and multiple CMEs caused one of the strongest geomagnetic storms of the 21st century, rated G5 on the NOAA scale. Widespread aurorae were seen across North America, Europe, and parts of Australia. Satellite operators reported temporary communications disruptions and elevated radiation levels.

=== August ===
- 19–21 August: A G3 storm followed a partial-halo CME from active region AR3742. Minor power grid fluctuations were reported in Scandinavia.

=== October ===
- 10–11 October: A G4 (Severe) geomagnetic storm watch was issued by NOAA following a fast CME from a flare on 8 October, with speeds of about 1200–1300 km/s. The event produced strong auroral displays, raised concerns about impacts on power and communications, and is cited as one of the most intense geomagnetic storms of 2024, with a Dst ~ –341 nT.

== Impact ==
The May 2024 storms temporarily increased auroral visibility to latitudes as low as 30°, disrupted some high-frequency radio communications, and caused several airlines to reroute polar flights. According to the European Space Agency, no long-term damage to satellites was reported.

== See also ==
- Solar cycle 25
- List of solar storms
- Geomagnetic storm
- Space weather
