= Solar cycle 25 =

Solar activity from 2019 to about 2030

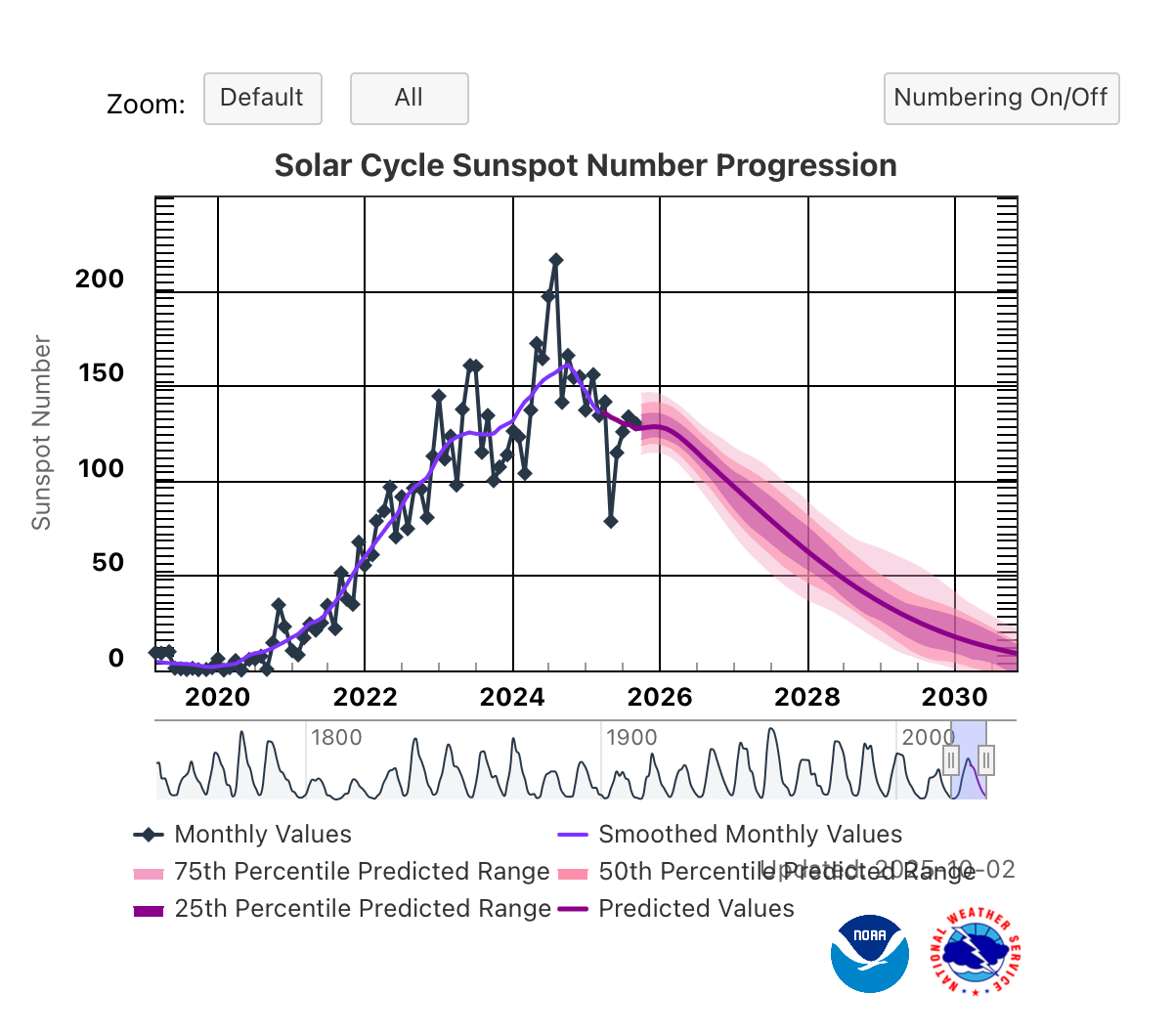
- ISES Solar Cycle 25 sunspot number progression up to September 2025

Sunspot data
- Start date: December 2019
- End date: about 2030
- Max count: 216 (not smoothed); 160.8 (smoothed)
- Max count month: August 2024 (not smoothed) October 2024 (smoothed)
- Min count: 1.8

Cycle chronology
- Previous cycle: Solar cycle 24 (2008–2019)

Solar cycle 25 is the current solar cycle, the 25th since 1755, when extensive recording of solar sunspot activity began. It began in December 2019 with a minimum smoothed sunspot number of 1.8. It is expected to continue until about 2030. While it was initially predicted by most scientists that cycle 25 would be relatively weak, solar activity has been much stronger than the predictions.

== Predictions ==
Widely varying predictions regarding the strength of cycle 25 ranged from very weak with suggestions of slow slide in to a Maunder minimum like state to a weak cycle similar to previous cycle 24 and even a strong cycle. Upton and Hathaway predicted that the weakness of cycle 25 would make it part of the Modern Gleissberg Minimum.

The Solar Cycle 25 Prediction Panel predicted in December 2019 that solar cycle 25 will be similar to solar cycle 24, with the preceding solar cycle minimum in April 2020 (± 6 months), and the number of sunspots reaching a (smoothed) maximum of 115 in July 2025 (± 8 months). This prediction is in line with the current general agreement in the scientific literature, which holds that solar cycle 25 will be weaker than average (i.e. weaker than during the exceptionally strong Modern Maximum). However, observations from 2020 to 2022, the first three years of the cycle, significantly exceeded predicted values.

The prediction of the smoothed cycle maximum is within the error bar in 3 cases: De Jager, C. et al. used an improved method of Schove based on wavelets (it gives almost the exact value), Xu, J.C. et al. a modified bimodal distribution method (it gives the exact month of the maximum) and Ozguc, et al. the empirical dynamical modelling method.

Cycle 25 predictions
Source	Date	Cycle max	Cycle start	Cycle end
Thompson, M.J. et al.	August 2014		Q4 2019	
Zharkova, V. et al 2014, 2015. (Northumbria U.)	October 2014	65 (80% of cycle 24)		
Upton, L.A. and Hathaway, D.H. (Solar Observatories Group, Stanford University)	December 2018	78 (95% of cycle 24)	Late 2020 – Early 2021	
Xu, J.C. et al. (Chinese Academy of Sciences)	August 2018	168.5 ± 16.3 (2024)	October 2020	
Bhowmik, P. and Nandy, D. (IISER Kolkata)	December 2018	124 ± 15 (2023–2025)	2020	after 2031
Ozguc, A. et al. (Harvard U-ty)	December 2018	154 ± 12 (2023.2±1.1)		
NOAA / SSRC	April 2019	117 ± 23 (2023–2026)	mid-2019 – late 2020	
NASA	June 2019	70 ± 29 (30–50% lower than Cycle 24 (2025))	2020	
NOAA / SSRC (update)	December 2019	115 ± 10 (July 2025)	April 2020 (± 6 months)	
Mcintosh et al.	June 2020	229 ± 25		
Mcintosh et al.	December 2020	190 ± 20		
National Center for Atmospheric Research	December 2020	233		
de Jager, C. and Duhau, S.	December 2020	160 ± 8 (2025 ± 1)		
Actual, for comparison	Present	>160.8	December 2019	–

== Progress ==
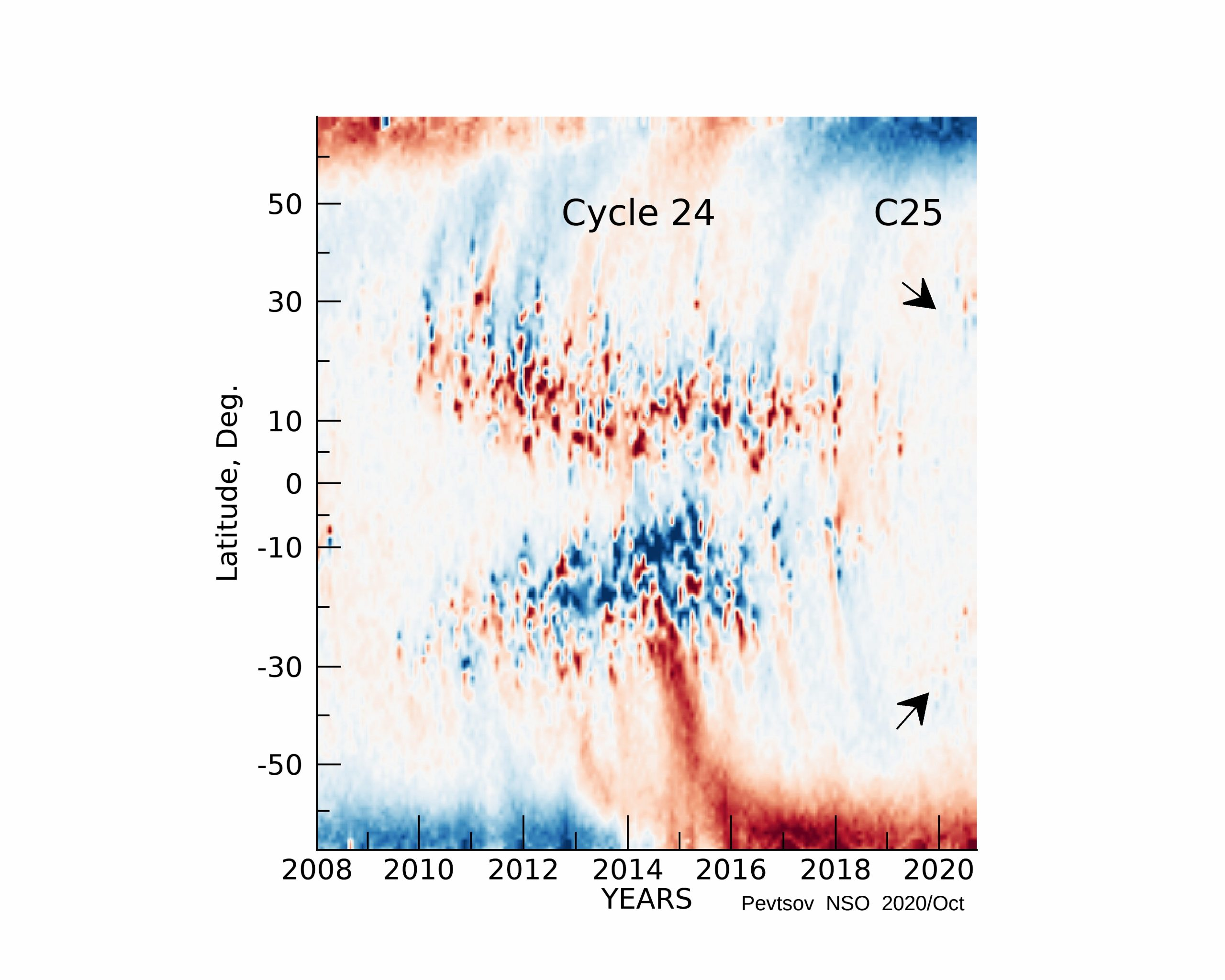
Time vs. solar latitude diagram of the radial component of the solar magnetic field (supersynoptic map or “butterfly” diagram) for cycle 24 based on the (zero-point corrected) integer rotation synoptic maps from GONG. Blue/red show negative/positive polarity fields scaled between ±5 Gauss. Two black arrows mark approximate location of two latitudinal bands of cycle 25. Data are acquired by GONG instruments operated by NISP/NSO/AURA/NSF.

As of April 2018, the Sun showed signs of a reverse magnetic polarity sunspot appearing and beginning this solar cycle. It is typical during the transition from one cycle to the next to experience a period where sunspots of both polarities exist (during the solar minimum). The polarward reversed polarity sunspots suggested that a transition to cycle 25 was in process. The first cycle 25 sunspot may have appeared in early April 2018 or even December 2016.

In November 2019, two reversed polarity sunspots appeared, possibly signaling the onset of cycle 25.

Nandy et al., analyzed the polarity orientation of bipolar magnetic regions observed in December 2019 and concluded that magnetic regions with the underlying orientation of solar cycle 25 toroidal field component were brewing in the solar convection zone, representing early signs of the new cycle.

Supersynoptic (time vs. solar latitude) map of the radial component of the solar magnetic field for cycles 24–25 based on observations from the Global Oscillations Network Group (GONG) shows magnetic activity of cycle 25 beginning November 2019 at about 30 degree latitudes in both solar hemispheres. A more recent supersynoptic map is available.

Solar Cycle 25 peaked in October 2024, with a Smoothed Sunspot Number of 161. SILSO stated: "For the coming years, another maximum remains a possibility, but it is unlikely it will be higher than the one in October last year because the Sun has completed its polar field reversal in 2023, and because the ongoing solar cycle is already 5.5 years in progress."

The following table gives the number of days so far in cycle 25 against the number up to the same point in cycle 24, which have passed various thresholds for the numbers of sunspots.

Counts	SC 24 to Dec 1, 2014	SC 25 to Dec 1, 2025
≥100	622	947
≥125	327	662
≥150	123	406
≥175	30	200
≥200	3	98
≥225	0	36
≥250	0	16
≥275	0	5

As at Dec 1, 2025, solar cycle 25 is averaging 31% more spots per day than solar cycle 24 at the same point in the cycle (Dec 1, 2014).

- Year 1 of SC25 (Dec 2019 to Nov 2020) averaged 101% more spots per day than year 1 of SC24.
- Year 2 of SC25 (Dec 2020 to Nov 2021) averaged 7% more spots per day than year 2 of SC24.
- Year 3 of SC25 (Dec 2021 to Nov 2022) averaged 8% more spots per day than year 3 of SC24.
- Year 4 of SC25 (Dec 2022 to Nov 2023) averaged 41% more spots per day than year 4 of SC24.
- Year 5 of SC25 (Dec 2023 to Nov 2024) averaged 71% more spots per day than year 5 of SC24.
- Year 6 of SC25 (Dec 2024 to Nov 2025) averaged 10% more spots per day than year 6 of SC24.

== Events ==
The strongest flares of Solar Cycle 25 (above M5.0 class) and related events

Class	Date	Sunspot region	Radio B.	SR Storm	CME	GM Storm
X9.05	2024-10-03	3842	R3	–	Yes	G2
X8.79	2024-05-14	3664	R3	–	Yes	?
X8.11	2026-02-02	4366	R3	–	Yes	–
X7.15	2024-10-01	3842	R3	–	Yes	–
X6.37	2024-02-23	3590	R3	–	No	–
X5.89	2024-05-11	3664	R3	S2	Yes	?
X5.16	2025-11-11	4274	R3	S2	Yes	?
X5.01	2023‑12‑31	3536	R3	S1	Yes	–
X4.54	2024-09-14	3825	R3	S1	Yes	G3
X4.52	2024-05-06	3663	R3	–	Yes	G5
X4.05	2025-11-14	4274	R3	–	Yes	G1
X3.98	2024-05-10	3664	R3	S2	Yes	G5
X3.48	2024-05-15	3664	R3	–	Yes	?
X3.38	2024-02-09	3575	R3	S2	Yes	–
X3.33	2024-10-24	3869	R3	S0	Yes	–
X2.99	2024-05-15	3685	R3	S1	Yes	?
X2.9	2024-05-27	3697	R3	–	Yes	–
X2.87	2023‑12‑14	3514	R3	S1	Yes	G1
X2.7	2025-05-14	4087	R3	–	Yes	?
X2.56	2024-02-16	3576	R3	S0	Yes	–
X2.39	2024-11-06	3883	R3	–	Yes	G2
X2.29	2024-12-08	3912	R3	–	Yes	–
X2.28	2023‑02‑17	3229	R3	–	Yes	–
X2.25	2022‑04‑20	2992	R3	–	Yes	–
X2.25	2024-05-09	3664	R3	S2	Yes	G5
X2.2	2024-12-08	3912	R3	–	Yes	–
X2.19	2024-10-07	3842	R3	S0	Yes	G3
X2.07	2023‑03‑03	3234	R3	–	Yes	–
X2.03	2024-10-31	3878	R3	–	Yes	–
X2.03	2025-02-23	4001	R3	S0	Yes	G1
X2.0	2024-07-16	3738	R3	–	Yes	?
X1.98	2023‑01‑09	3184	R3	–	No	–
X1.95	2025-12-01	4299	R3	–	Yes	–
X1.91	2025-06-19	4114	R3	–	Yes	–
X1.9	2024-02-21	3590	R3	–	No	–
X1.86	2024-10-26	3872	R3	S2	Yes	G1
X1.85	2025-01-04	3947	R3	–	Yes	–
X1.84	2024-10-09	3848	R3	S3	Yes	G5
X1.8	2025-11-04	4274	R3	–	Yes	–
X1.73	2024-08-05	3767	R3	S0	Yes	–
X1.72	2024-05-14	3664	R3	–	Yes	?
X1.7	2024-02-22	3590	R3	–	No	–
X1.7	2025-11-09	4274	R3	–	Yes	–
X1.69	2024-05-02	3663	R3	–	Yes	–
X1.63	2023‑08‑05	3386	R3	S1	Yes	–
X1.59	2021‑07‑03	2838	R3	–	Yes	–
X1.59	2024-12-30	3936	R3	S0	Yes	G4
X1.57	2024-07-29	3764	R3	–	No	–
X1.55	2024-06-10	3697	R3	–	Yes	?
X1.54	2024-05-11	3664	R3	–	No	–
X1.51	2022‑05‑10	3006	R3	–	No	–
X1.51	2023‑08‑07	3386	R3	S1	Yes	–
X1.45	2024-05-29	3697	R3	S0	Yes	?
X1.43	2024-06-01	3697	R3	–	No	–
X1.43	2024-10-09	3842	R3	–	Yes	G4
X1.38	2022‑03‑30	2975	R3	S1	Yes	G1
X1.32	2024-05-05	3663	R3	–	No	–
X1.31	2024-08-08	3777	R3	–	Yes	–
X1.3	2024-09-12	3825	R3	–	No	–
X1.29	2024-05-05	3663	R3	–	No	–
X1.27	2023‑03‑29	3256	R3	–	Yes	–
X1.27	2024-07-14	3738	R3	–	No	–
X1.27	2025-06-17	4114	R3	–	No	–
X1.25	2024-05-14	3664	R3	–	Yes	?
X1.22	2023‑01‑06	3182	R3	–	No	–
X1.21	2025-01-03	3947	R3	–	Yes	G1
X1.21	2025-05-13	4086	R3	S0	Yes	?
X1.21	2025-11-10	4274	R3	–	Yes	–
X1.18	2024-05-31	3697	R3	–	No	–
X1.17	2022‑04‑17	2994	R3	–	Yes	–
X1.17	2024-08-05	3780	R3	–	No	–
X1.16	2023‑02‑11	3217	R3	–	No	–
X1.14	2025-01-03	3947	R3	–	Yes	G1
X1.14	2025-03-28	4046	R3	–	Yes	–
X1.14	2025-12-08	4298	R3	–	Yes	–
X1.13	2022‑04‑30	2994	R3	–	Yes	–
X1.13	2022‑05‑03	3006	R3	–	No	–
X1.12	2024-03-23	3614	R3	S2	Yes	G4
X1.12	2024-03-29	3615	R3	–	Yes	–
X1.12	2025-05-25	4098	R3	–	Yes	–
X1.12	2024-05-09	3664	R3	S2	Yes	G5
X1.11	2023‑06‑20	3341	R3	–	Yes	–
X1.11	2024-08-14	3784	R3	–	Yes	–
X1.11	2024‑12-29	3936	R3	–	Yes	–
X1.1	2025-01-03	3947	R3	–	No	–
X1.1	2025-11-04	4276	R3	–	Yes	–
X1.08	2023‑07‑02	3354	R3	–	No	–
X1.08	2024-05-08	3663	R3	–	No	–
X1.06	2022‑10‑02	3110	R3	–	Yes	–
X1.06	2023‑01‑10	3186	R3	–	Yes	–
X1.04	2024-05-08	3663	R3	–	Yes	G5
X1.03	2024-06-01	3697	R3	?	?	?
X1.02	2024-05-08	3664	R3	–	No	–
X1.02	2024-05-12	3664	R3	–	No	–
X1.02	2024-10-07	3842	R3	S0	Yes	G3
X1.0	2021‑10‑28	2887	R3	S1	Yes	–
M9.92	2024-07-28	3762	R2	–	No	–
M9.87	2024-05-08	3664	R2	–	Yes	G5
M9.82	2023‑11‑28	3500	R2	–	Yes	G3
M9.76	2024-03-28	3615	R2	–	No	–
M9.75	2024-06-08	3697	R2	S3	Yes	?
M9.67	2022‑03‑31	2975	R2	–	Yes	
M9.66	2022‑04‑21	2993	R2	–	Yes	–
M9.62	2023‑05‑16	3310	R2		No	–
M9.56	2024-06-10	3697	R2	–	Yes	?
M9.53	2023-04-30	3654	R2	–	No	–
M9.53	2024-10-26	3873	R2	–	No	–
M9.49	2024-11-10	3889	R2	–	Yes	–
M9.45	2024-11-25	3910	R2	–	Yes	–
M9.42	2024-03-30	3615	R2	–	Yes	–
M9.4	2024-07-30	3772	R2	–	Yes	–
M9.39	2024-03-30	3615	R2	–	Yes	–
M9.36	2024-06-23	3723	R2	–	No	–
M9.13	2024-05-04	3663	R2	–	No	–
M9.10	2024-05-04	3663	R2	–	No	–
M9.05	2024-12-23	3932	R2	–	Yes	–
M9.04	2024-02-10	3576	R2	S1	Yes	–
M8.96	2023‑05‑20	3311	R2	–	No	–
M8.9	2025-05-25	4098	R2	–	Yes	–
M8.88	2025-02-03	3981	R2	–	No	–
M8.87	2024-05-11	3664	R2	S2	Yes	–
M8.77	2022‑10‑02	3110	R2	–	Yes	G1
M8.77	2024-07-29	3762	R2	–	Yes	?
M8.72	2023‑09‑21	3435	R2	–	Yes	G2
M8.69	2024-05-08	3664	R2	–	Yes	G5
M8.67	2022‑08‑29	3088	R2	–	No	–
M8.65	2025-11-05	4274	R2	–	Yes	–
M8.62	2023‑02‑28	3234	R2	–	Yes	–
M8.42	2024-05-05	3663	R2	–	No	–
M8.4	2025-06-15	4114	R2	–	Yes	–
M8.29	2024-05-07	3663	R2	–	No	–
M8.24	2024-08-01	3772	R2	–	No	–
M8.23	2023‑09‑20	3435	R2	–	No	–
M8.2	2025-05-31	4100	R2	–	Yes	–
M8.12	2025-12-06	4299	R2	–	Yes	–
M7.92	2022‑09‑16	3098	R2	–	No	–
M7.92	2024-05-08	3664	R2	–	No	–
M7.88	2024-07-28	3766	R2	–	No	–
M7.79	2024-07-28	3762	R2	–	No	–
M7.77	2024-10-09	3842	R2	–	No	–
M7.75	2024-07-31	3772	R2	–	No	–
M7.74	2025-05-14	4087	R2	–	No	–
M7.69	2025-02-06	3981	R2	–	Yes	G1
M7.68	2024-09-30	3842	R2	–	No	–
M7.64	2025-01-04	3947	R2	–	No	–
M7.6	2025-02-07	3981	R2	–	No	–
M7.48	2024-03-20	3615	R2	–	No	–
M7.47	2024-05-05	3663	R2	–	No	–
M7.46	2025-01-17	3964	R2	–	No	–
M7.45	2025-11-05	4274	R2	–	Yes	–
M7.43	2024-03-10	3599	R2	S0	Yes	–
M7.43	2024-08-02	3768	R2	–	Yes	G3
M7.35	2024-06-01	3697	R2	–	Yes	?
M7.34	2024-12-26	3938	R2	–	No	–
M7.3	2024-08-03	3775	R2	–	No	–
M7.29	2022‑04‑20	2992	R2	–	Yes	–
M7.27	2023‑05‑03	3293	R2	–	No	–
M7.25	2024-05-17	3685	R2	?	Yes	?
M7.24	2022‑08‑26	3089	R2	–	Yes	–
M7.24	2024-10-30	3878	R2	–	No	–
M7.2	2025-12-31	4324	R2	–	Yes	–
M7.17	2024-05-08	3664	R2	–	No	–
M7.14	2024-12-29	3936	R2	–	No	–
M7.12	2023‑05‑01	3288	R2	–	No	–
M7.1	2024-03-28	3615	R2	–	No	–
M6.97	2023‑07‑12	3372	R2	–	No	–
M6.97	2023‑12‑15	3514	R2	–	Yes	G1
M6.87	2024-09-12	3811	R2	–	Yes	–
M6.83	2023‑07‑11	3368	R2	–	No	–
M6.83	2024-01-29	3559	R2	S2	Yes	–
M6.8	2025-06-14	4105	R2	–	Yes	–
M6.77	2024-03-18	3615	R2	–	No	–
M6.76	2025-01-31	3978	R2	–	Yes	–
M6.73	2022‑08‑28	3088	R2	–	Yes	–
M6.71	2024-12-11	3912	R2	–	No	–
M6.66	2024-05-13	3664	R2	S2	Yes	?
M6.57	2023‑05‑09	3296	R2	–	Yes	–
M6.52	2024-10-19	3854	R2	–	Yes	–
M6.51	2024-07-29	3772	R2	–	Yes	–
M6.5	2023‑05‑20	3311	R2	–	No	–
M6.5	2024-02-12	3576	R2	–	No	–
M6.46	2024-12-10	3922	R2	–	No	–
M6.4	2025-06-16	4114	R2	–	Yes	–
M6.39	2023‑02‑07	3213	R2	–	No	–
M6.36	2022‑12‑14	3165	R2	–	No	–
M6.35	2023‑02‑25	3229	R2	S1	Yes	G3
M6.2	2022‑09‑16	3098	R2	–	No	–
M6.17	2025-02-03	3981	R2	–	No	–
M6.14	2024-03-28	3615	R2	–	No	–
M6.14	2024-08-05	3780	R2	–	Yes	–
M6.12	2024-06-06	3697	R2	–	No	–
M6.07	2024-08-01	3772	R2	–	No	–
M6.07	2025-12-04	4300	R2	–	No	–
M6.04	2024-07-31	3772	R2	–	No	–
M6.03	2023‑01‑15	3191	R2	–	Yes	–
M6.01	2023‑09‑03	3413	R2	–	Yes	–
M5.97	2024-05-10	3664	R2	–	No	–
M5.96	2025-11-28	4294	R2	–	Yes	–
M5.89	2025-01-03	3947	R2	–	Yes	–
M5.86	2022‑10‑01	3110	R2	–	Yes	G1
M5.86	2023‑07‑11	3372	R2	–	No	–
M5.84	2023‑12‑14	3514	R2	–	Yes	G1
M5.8	2023‑03‑06	3243	R2	–	Yes	–
M5.76	2022‑05‑04	3004	R2	–	No	–
M5.76	2024-06-20	3719	R2	–	No	–
M5.74	2022‑12‑15	3165	R2	–	No	–
M5.73	2024-05-29	3691	R2	–	No	–
M5.72	2023‑07‑17	3363	R2	S2	Yes	–
M5.68	2023‑05‑20	3311	R2	–	No	–
M5.67	2023‑01‑11	3184	R2	–	Yes	–
M5.61	2025-04-01	4046	R2	–	No	–
M5.59	2024-11-04	3883	R2	–	Yes	–
M5.57	2024-09-01	3813	R2	S0	Yes	–
M5.54	2022‑05‑19	3014	R2	–	No	–
M5.51	2023‑08‑06	3386	R2	–	Yes	–
M5.5	2022‑01‑20	2929	R2	S1	Yes	–
M5.49	2023‑12‑08	3511	R2	–	No	–
M5.47	2024-04-11	3639	R2	–	Yes	–
M5.46	2024-08-03	3775	R2	–	No	–
M5.41	2023‑03‑30	3256	R2	S0	Yes	–
M5.41	2024-09-13	3811	R2	–	No	–
M5.39	2022‑08‑26	3089	R2	–	No	–
M5.39	2023‑05‑19	3311	R2	–	No	–
M5.39	2024-07-31	3772	R2	–	No	–
M5.35	2024-07-13	3738	R2	–	No	–
M5.34	2024-06-12	3697	R2	–	No	–
M5.32	2022‑05‑04	3006	R2	–	No	–
M5.32	2024-08-14	3790	R2	–	No	–
M5.32	2025-05-14	4087	R2	–	No	–
M5.31	2024-11-06	3889	R2	–	No	–
M5.3	2024-08-10	3780	R2	–	No	–
M5.28	2024-09-13	3811	R2	–	No	–
M5.27	2022‑03‑04	3234	R2	–	Yes	–
M5.25	2022‑11‑07	3141	R2	–	No	–
M5.2	2023‑05‑20	3311	R2	–	No	–
M5.18	2024-02-07	3575	R2	–	Yes	–
M5.18	2024-05-07	3663	R2	–	No	–
M5.18	2024-08-23	3800	R2	–	No	–
M5.15	2023‑01‑10	3186	R2	S0	Yes	–
M5.15	2025-02-02	3977	R2	–	No	–
M5.15	2024-08-21	3796	R2	–	No	–
M5.12	2024-01-23	3559	R2	–	Yes	–
M5.09	2023‑02‑21	3234	R2	–	Yes	–
M5.08	2022‑08‑16	3078	R2	–	No	–
M5.07	2024-07-13	3738	R2	–	No	–
M5.05	2024-07-17	3743	R2	–	No	–
M5.04	2023‑03‑05	3243	R2	–	No	–
M5.03	2024-09-12	3811	R2	–	No	–
M5.02	2023‑05‑09	3296	R2	–	No	–
M5.02	2024-08-07	3777	R2	–	Yes	–
M5.01	2025-11-03	4274	R2	–	Yes	–

Farside flares (above M5.0 class) observed by STIX

Class	Date	Sunspot region	Class (seen from Earth)
X14	2024-07-22	3738	–
X12	2024-05-20	3664	–
X9	2023-07-16	3368	–
X9	2024-05-15	3664	X3.48
X9	2024-05-15	3664	–
X7	2024-07-24	3738	–
X6	2023-01-03	3182	C4.06
X6	2023-07-16	3368	–
X6	2023-12-31	3536	X5.01
X6	2024-05-17	3664	–
X5	2024-05-16	3664	–
X4	2023-09-08	3413	–
X4	2023-09-11	3413	–
X4	2024-09-09	3792	–
X3	2024-04-03	?	–
X3	2024-06-11	3697	–
X3	2024-06-13	3697	–
X3	2024-06-17	3697	–
X3	2024-09-03	3792	–
X2	2022-04-30	2994	M1.99
X2	2023-07-10	3354	–
X2	2024-02-02	?	–
X2	2024-05-14	3664	X1.25
X2	2024-08-20	?	–
X2	2024-09-05	3792	–
X1	2020-11-18	2786	–
X1	2022-05-01	2994	C1.9
X1	2022-08-29	3088	M8.68
X1	2022-08-30	3088	M1.7
X1	2022-08-30	3088	C7.18
X1	2022-09-29	3112	C5.76
X1	2022-12-27	3180	–
X1	2023-05-14	3310	–
X1	2023-05-23	3323	–
X1	2023-07-07	3354	–
X1	2023-07-08	3354	–
X1	2023-07-13	3360	–
X1	2023-07-14	3372	–
X1	2023-07-18	3368	–
X1	2023-07-24	?	–
X1	2024-05-25	3664	–
X1	2024-06-16	3697	–
X1	2024-07-24	3738	–
X1	2024-07-25	3738	–
X1	2024-07-27	3738	–
X1	2024-07-28	3738	–
X1	2024-08-02	3738	M1.33
X1	2024-08-04	3762	–
X1	2024-08-06	3762	–
X1	2024-08-20	?	–
X1	2024-08-21	?	–
X1	2024-11-25	3910	M9.45
X1	2024-12-30	?	M5.02
X1	2025-04-16	4043	–
M9	2022-05-05	2994	–
M9	2022-08-29	3088	M4.71
M9	2022-09-05	3088	–
M9	2022-09-11	3089	–
M9	2023-05-30	3323	–
M9	2023-06-01	3310	–
M9	2023-07-15	?	–
M9	2023-07-18	3368	–
M9	2024-07-23	3738	–
M8	2022-05-01	2994	–
M8	2022-05-10	2994	–
M8	2022-08-31	3088	–
M8	2022-09-10	3089	–
M8	2022-12-27	3180	–
M8	2023-05-14	3310	–
M8	2023-06-04	?	–
M8	2023-01-10	3549	C9.64
M8	2024-07-30	3738	–
M8	2024-08-05	3762	–
M8	2024-08-15	3796	–
M8	2024-08-20	?	–
M8	2024-08-23	?	–
M7	2022-01-12	?	–
M7	2022-01-25	?	C3.79
M7	2022-05-05	2994	–
M7	2022-05-10	2994	–
M7	2022-08-30	3088	C7.57
M7	2022-09-11	3089	–
M7	2023-01-10	3190	–
M7	2023-05-25	3323	–
M7	2023-07-11	3354	–
M7	2024-06-10	?	–
M7	2024-06-17	3697	–
M7	2024-08-17	?	–
M7	2024-09-05	3792	–
M7	2024-09-13	3811	M5.41
M7	2024-12-19	3928	M3.81
M7	2024-12-21	?	–
M6	2022-04-30	2994	M4.82
M6	2022-05-01	2994	–
M6	2022-05-01	2994	–
M6	2022-05-05	2994	–
M6	2022-09-17	3098	M2.61
M6	2023-02-14	3229	–
M6	2023-02-20	3234	M4.43
M6	2023-07-07	3354	–
M6	2023-07-09	3354	–
M6	2023-07-09	3354	–
M6	2023-07-09	3354	–
M6	2023-07-11	3372	M1.17
M6	2023-07-13	3360	–
M6	2023-07-19	3363	M3.81
M6	2023-07-22	3363	–
M6	2023-10-31	3477	–
M6	2024-01-10	3549	C7.01
M6	2024-06-13	3697	–
M6	2024-06-17	3697	–
M6	2024-07-29	3762	–
M6	2024-08-13	?	–
M6	2024-08-23	?	–
M6	2024-12-20	3928	M2.53
M6	2025-04-17	4043	–
M5	2021-07-15	?	–
M5	2022-04-19	2992	M3.71
M5	2022-05-17	3014	C9.91
M5	2022-08-29	3088	M2.58
M5	2022-09-01	3088	–
M5	2022-09-14	3089	–
M5	2022-09-29	3112	–
M5	2022-12-28	3180	C6.09
M5	2023-05-12	3310	–
M5	2023-05-16	3310	–
M5	2023-06-08	?	–
M5	2023-07-16	?	–
M5	2023-08-08	3387	M3.67
M5	2023-08-08	3387	–
M5	2024-05-12	3685	–
M5	2024-05-14	3685	–
M5	2024-05-16	3664	–
M5	2024-05-16	3664	–
M5	2024-05-22	3664	–
M5	2024-06-28	?	–
M5	2024-07-03	?	–
M5	2024-07-24	3738	–
M5	2024-08-23	?	–
M5	2024-08-24	?	–
M5	2024-12-15	3920	M3.11
M5	2025-04-15	4062	M1.52
M5	2025-05-19	?	M3.27
M5	2025-05-20	?	–

Solar flares by year
- M5–M9
- X1–X5
- X5–X9

Number of days at geomagnetic storm intensity
- Kp1
- Kp2
- Kp3
- Kp4
- Kp5 (G1)
- Kp6 (G2)
- Kp7 (G3)
- Kp8 (G4)
- Kp9 (G5)

=== 2020 ===
Solar flares in 2020
- C
- M
- X

Number of days at geomagnetic storm intensity in 2020
- Kp1
- Kp2
- Kp3
- Kp4
- Kp5 (G1)
- Kp6 (G2)
- Kp7 (G3)
- Kp8 (G4)
- Kp9 (G5)

On 29 May, the first C-class solar flares of Solar Cycle 25 took place, as well as the first M-class flare. Solar activity continued to increase in the following months, especially abruptly in October, with flares taking place on a near-daily basis by November. On 29 November, an M4.4 flare, the strongest of the cycle to date, took place, possibly indicating that the solar cycle would be more active than initially thought.

On 8 December, a small coronal mass ejection was found heading directly towards Earth shortly after a strong C-class solar flare, hitting the planet on 9–10 December and causing bright aurorae at high latitudes.

=== 2021 ===
Solar flares in 2021
- C
- M
- X

Number of days at geomagnetic storm intensity in 2021
- Kp1
- Kp2
- Kp3
- Kp4
- Kp5 (G1)
- Kp6 (G2)
- Kp7 (G3)
- Kp8 (G4)
- Kp9 (G5)

The first X-class solar flare of the cycle took place on 3 July, peaking at X1.59.

On 22 July, a total of six different active regions were seen on the solar disk for the first time since 6 September 2017.

On 9 October, a M1.6 class solar flare erupted sending a coronal mass ejection that hit Earth on 12 October, triggering a (moderate) G2 geomagnetic storm.

The second X-class flare of the solar cycle erupted on 28 October, producing a CME and a S1 solar radiation storm. Reports initially predicted that the CME could graze Earth, however geomagnetic storms on 30–31 October only reached a moderate K_{p} index of 4.

On 3 and 4 November, the K_{p} index reached 8−, equivalent to a G4 geomagnetic storm. This was the most intense geomagnetic storm to hit Earth since September 2017.

=== 2022 ===
Solar flares in 2022
- C
- M
- X

Number of days at geomagnetic storm intensity in 2022
- Kp1
- Kp2
- Kp3
- Kp4
- Kp5 (G1)
- Kp6 (G2)
- Kp7 (G3)
- Kp8 (G4)
- Kp9 (G5)

In late March, sunspot region 2975 released X1.3 and M9.6 flares, the former causing a G1 geomagnetic storm on 31 March despite being near the solar limb. The region rotated out of view of Earth on 5 April, but helioseismic measurements on April 8 showed it still active on the far side of the Sun. On 12 April, a Coronal Mass Ejection on the far side likely erupted from the region, with helioseismic measurements showing the region to have intensified since crossing over the limb. As the region began rotating into view from Earth, a possibly X-class flare occurred on 15 April.

After rotating to the visible hemisphere of the Sun, the regions of the sunspot complex were designated 2993 through 2996. On 17 April, sunspot group 2994 released an X1.2 flare. However, the complex's activity subsided slightly in the next few days. While crossing the solar limb, sunspot region 2992 emitted M7.3 and X2.2 flares, the latter being the strongest of the cycle up to that point.

=== 2023 ===
Solar flares in 2023
- C
- M
- X

Number of days at geomagnetic storm intensity in 2023
- Kp1
- Kp2
- Kp3
- Kp4
- Kp5 (G1)
- Kp6 (G2)
- Kp7 (G3)
- Kp8 (G4)
- Kp9 (G5)

On 24 March, an intense geomagnetic storm hit Earth unexpectedly, reaching a level of G4 and producing auroras as far south as New Mexico. A minor CME from an M1 flare was predicted to hit the day earlier, but the timing and intensity were unexpected. Later, on 23 and 24 April, more G4 storms hit Earth, on the former day being tied with several days in solar cycle 24 for the strongest storm since 2005. Auroras were visible as far south as San Antonio, Texas.

On 14 December, a solar flare measuring X2.87 was recorded from sunspot region 3514, making it the strongest solar flare of the cycle for just 17 days, as on 31 December, a solar flare measuring X5.0 was recorded from sunspot 3536.

=== 2024 ===
Solar flares in 2024
- C
- M
- X

Number of days at geomagnetic storm intensity in 2024
- Kp1
- Kp2
- Kp3
- Kp4
- Kp5 (G1)
- Kp6 (G2)
- Kp7 (G3)
- Kp8 (G4)
- Kp9 (G5)

On 9 February, region 3575 produced an X3.4 flare, the second strongest of the cycle up to that point, causing radiation levels to briefly exceed S2 over the following days. On 12 February, after rotating to the far side of the Sun, the same region released a strong CME. As it was invisible from Earth, it was impossible to assess the flare's strength, but it nonetheless caused proton storm levels to briefly reach S2 again on 12–13 February.

On 22 February, region 3590 produced a solar flare measuring X6.3.

In May, the strongest solar storm in 20 years produced aurorae at far lower latitudes than usual. A few days later, on 14 May, region 3664 produced the strongest solar flare up to that point of the solar cycle, measuring X8.7.

On 20 May 2024, an X12 solar flare produced x-rays and gamma rays that hit Mars, while a coronal mass ejection launched a solar wind.

On 1 October 2024, an X7.1 solar flare occurred in sunspot region 3842, followed by an X9.0 solar flare just two days later.

=== 2025 ===
Solar flares in 2025
- C
- M
- X

Number of days at geomagnetic storm intensity in 2025
- Kp1
- Kp2
- Kp3
- Kp4
- Kp5 (G1)
- Kp6 (G2)
- Kp7 (G3)
- Kp8 (G4)
- Kp9 (G5)

On November 11, region 4274 produced an X5.16, being the strongest flare in 2025 and the 6th largest in Solar Cycle 25. It also released a super-fast CME at 1950km per second. Because of this, NOAA SWPC issue a rare, G4 watch for the next day. It also created an S2 solar radiation storm which followed from an S1 solar radiation storm a few days prior.

== See also ==
- Active region
