= Spörer Minimum =

Hypothesized period of low solar activity from 1460 to 1550

The Spörer Minimum is a hypothesized 90-year span of low solar activity, from about 1460 until 1550, which was identified and named by John A. Eddy in a landmark 1976 paper published in Science titled "The Maunder Minimum". It occurred before sunspots had been directly observed and was discovered instead by analysis of the proportion of carbon-14 in tree rings, which is strongly correlated with solar activity. It is named for the German astronomer Gustav Spörer.

== History of solar activity ==
Solar activity events recorded in radiocarbon. Values since 1950 not shown.

Solar activity events and approximate dates
Event	Start	End
Oort minimum	1010	1050
Oort minimum	1040	1080
Medieval maximum	1100	1250
Wolf minimum	1280	1350
Spörer Minimum	1460	1550
Maunder Minimum	1645	1715
Dalton Minimum	1790	1830
Modern Maximum	1950	2009

Solar variation can be quantified using sunspot counts, but this measure is only reliable for periods after records of sunspot observations were routinely made by western astronomers. For periods before sunspot records, solar activity can be found from proxy methods, most notably the production of radioisotopes in the Earth's atmosphere from interaction with cosmic rays, which are modulated by the solar activity. The carbon-14 method used by Spörer to identify the minimum makes use of the fact that high solar activity is correlated with low production of carbon-14 in the atmosphere.

Wilfried Schröder published a table of observed aurora borealis during the Spörer Minimum which showed that the solar cycle was active. Miyahara et al. likewise found the 11-year solar cycle was still prominently detected in the carbon-14 record even during the minimum. The amplitude of the 11-year cycle seems to have been modulated only from 1455 to 1510.

Jiang and Xu look at sunspot records and aurora sightings from China during the period and suggest that a minimum from 1450 to 1560 is specious. They suggest dates for the sunspot minimum of 1400 to 1510.

== Possible correlation with climate ==
Like the subsequent Maunder Minimum, the Spörer Minimum coincided with a time when Earth's climate was colder than average. This correlation has generated hypotheses that low solar activity produces cooler-than-average global temperatures, although Jiang and Xu point out that while the period 1430-1520 (starting slightly before the Spörer minimum) was indeed colder than average in China, the period 1520-1620 (the second half of the minimum) was warmer than average.

A specific mechanism by which solar activity results in climate change has not been established, One theory is modification of the Arctic Oscillation/North Atlantic Oscillation due to a change in solar output.

== See also ==
- Little Ice Age
