= Modern Maximum =

Period of high solar activity beginning in 1914

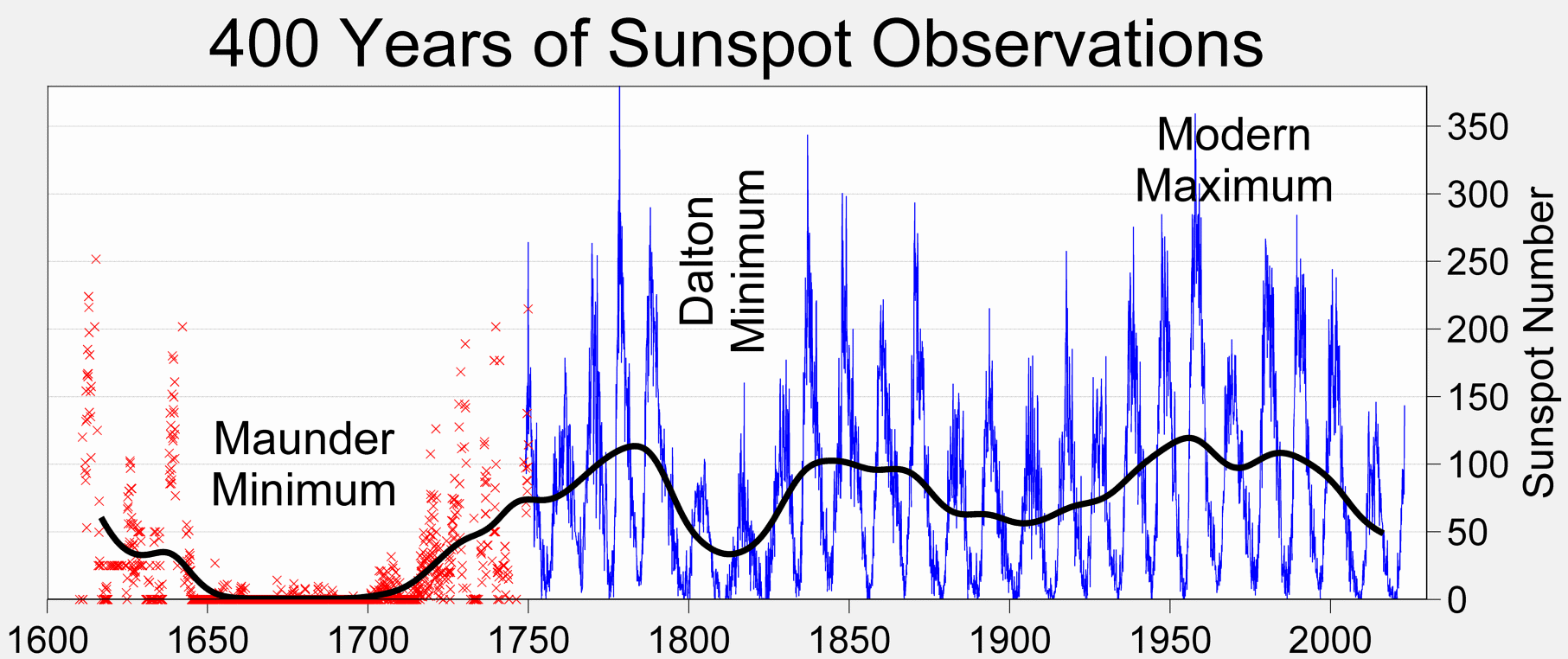
History of sunspot number observations showing the recent elevated activity.

The Modern Maximum was found by Sami Solanki, Ilya G. Usoskin and colleagues as the period of unusually high solar activity which began with solar cycle 15 in 1914. It reached a maximum in solar cycle 19 during the late 1950s and may have ended with the peak of solar cycle 23 in 2000, as solar cycle 24 is recording, at best, very muted solar activity. Another proposed end date for the maximum is 2007, with the decline phase of Cycle 23. In any case the low solar activity of solar cycle 24 in the 2010s marked a new period of reduced solar activity. However the on-going (as of 2025) solar cycle 25 significantly exceeded its predicted low maximum.

This maximum period is a natural example of solar variation, and one of many that are known from proxy records of past solar variability. The Modern Maximum reached a double peak once in the 1950s and again during the 1990s.

== See also ==
- Maunder minimum
