= A General Map of the World, or Terraqueous Globe =

Map that looks like a globe that is cut in half

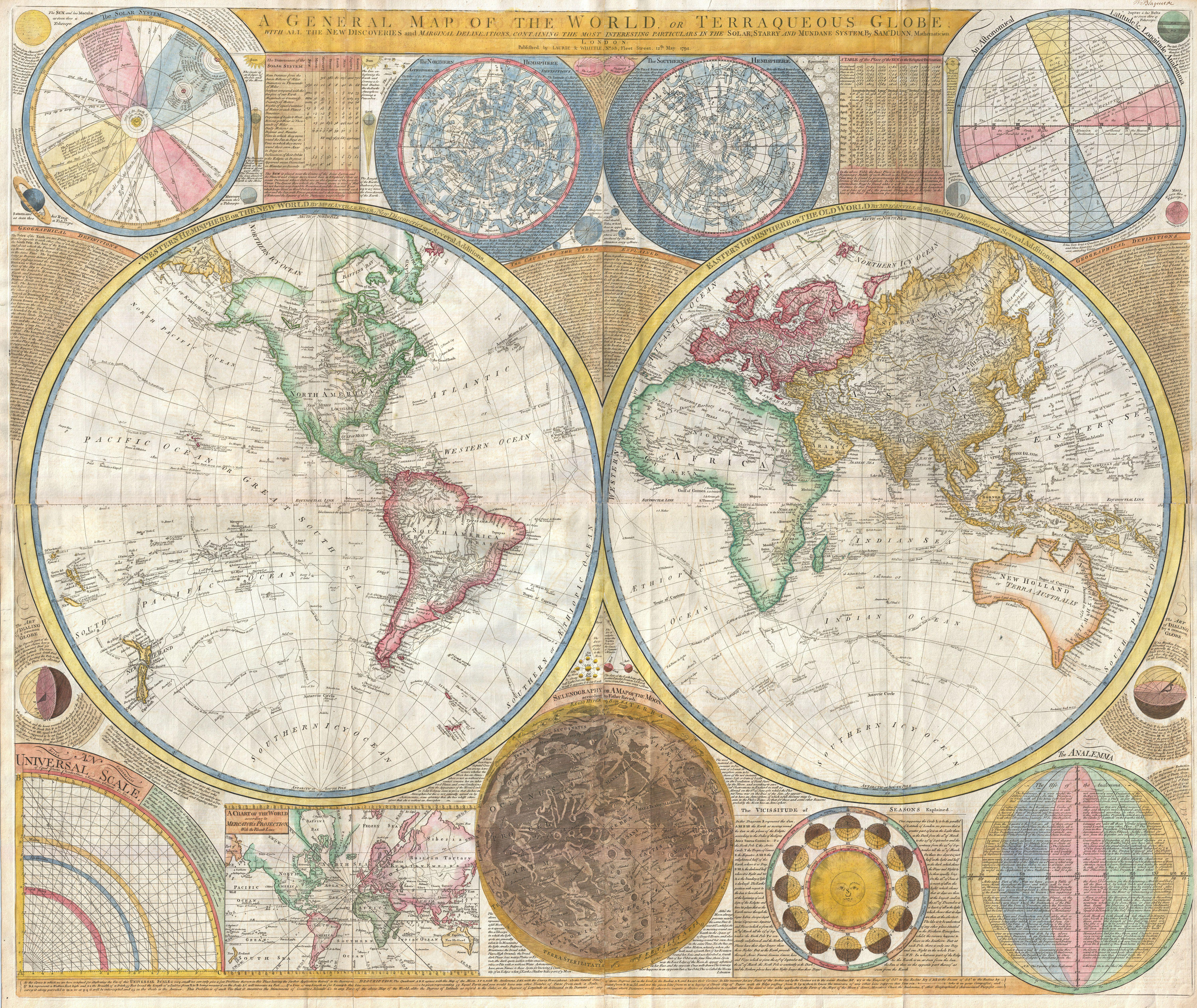

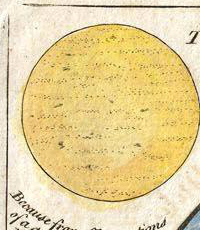
Sunspots in Samuel Dunn's wall map

A General Map of the World, or Terraqueous Globe, full title: A General Map of the World, or Terraqueous Globe with all the New Discoveries and Marginal Delineations, Containing the Most Interesting Particulars in the Solar, Starry and Mundane System, is a general map of the world including both land and water, with all the new discoveries and marginal delineations, containing interesting particulars in the solar, starry and mundane system by Samuel Dunn and Thomas Kitchin in 1794. The map features star charts, a map of the Moon, a map of the Solar System, and numerous other features along with maps of both hemispheres of the Earth. Samuel Dunn's map is large and includes much detail, and is challenging to fully describe it in small photographs or text.

== Map details ==
The primary map is surrounded on all sides by detailed scientific calculations and descriptions as well as Northern and Southern Hemisphere star charts, a map of the Moon, a latitude and longitude analemma chart, a map of the Solar System, a mercator projection of the Earth, an analemma projection, a seasonal chart, a universal scale chart, and numerous smaller diagrams depicting planets and mathematical systems. All text is in English. The survey of this map starts in North America, much of which was, even in 1794, largely unknown.

This map follows shortly after the explorations of captain James Cook in the Arctic and Pacific Northwest, so the general outline of the continent is known. However, when this map was made, few inland expeditions had extended westward beyond the Mississippi. This map notes two separate speculative courses for the apocryphal river of the west, a northern route extending from lake Winnipeg and a southern route passing south of Winnipeg through Pike's lake. The River of the West was hopeful dream of French and English explorers who were searching for a water passage through North America to the Pacific. In concept, should such a route be found, it would have become an important trade artery allowing the British and French, whose colonies dominated the eastern parts of North America, to compete with the Spanish for control of the lucrative Asia-Pacific trade. These earlier speculative cartographers didn't realize that the bulk of the Rocky Mountains stood between them and their plans. The kingdom of Quivira, which is one of the lands associated with Spanish legends of the Seven Cities of Gold is located slightly south of the western rivers.

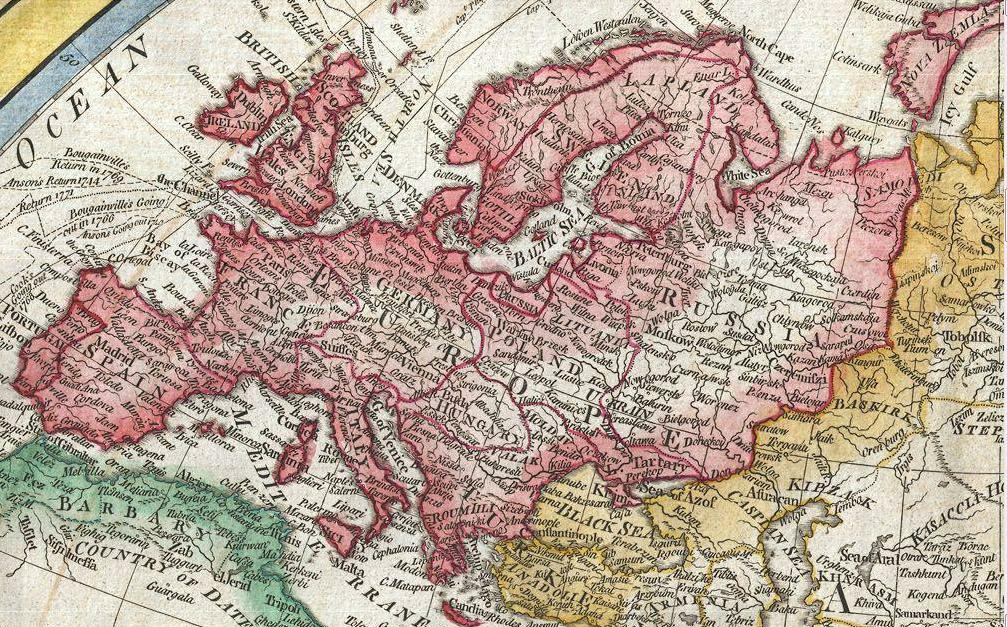
Europe

== See also ==
- Ancient world maps – List of early depictions of the world
- Cartography – Study and practice of making maps
- City maps
- Geographic information system – System to capture, manage, and present geographic data
- Here be dragons – Phrase used on maps to indicate uncharted areas
- List of cartographers
- List of historical maps
- Map projection – Systematic representation of the surface of a sphere or ellipsoid onto a plane
- Mappa mundi – Medieval European maps of the world
- Pictorial maps – Map that uses pictures to represent features
- Terra incognita – "Unknown land", area not mapped by cartographers
- Web mapping – Types of interactive mapping services
- World map – Map of most or all of the surface of the Earth
