= Gustav Spörer =

German astronomer (1822-1895)

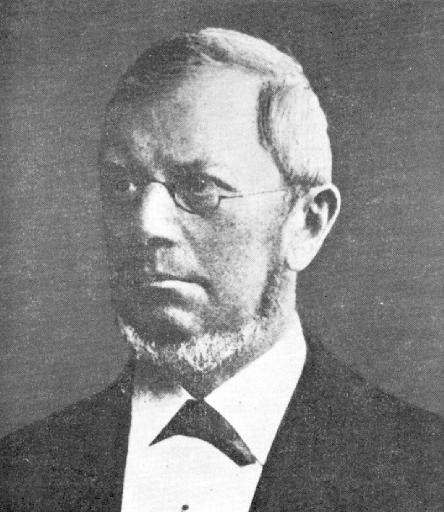
Portrait of Gustav Spörer.

Friederich Wilhelm Gustav Spörer (23 October 1822 – 7 July 1895) was a German astronomer.

He is noted for his studies of sunspots and sunspot cycles. In this regard he is often mentioned together with Edward Maunder. Spörer was the first to note a prolonged period of low sunspot activity from 1645 to 1715. This period is known as the Maunder Minimum.

Spörer was a contemporary of Richard Christopher Carrington, an English astronomer. Carrington is generally credited with discovering Spörer's law, which governs the variation of sunspot latitudes during the course of a solar cycle. Spörer added to Carrington's observations of sunspot drift and is sometimes credited with the discovery.

The Spörer minimum was a period of low sunspot activity from roughly 1420 to 1570.

== Life ==
From 1833 to 1840 Spörer attended Friedrich-Wilhelms-Gymnasium in Berlin and afterwards studied mathematics and natural history at Berliner Universität until 1843. He gained his doctorate on 14. December 1843 with a work on a comet of 1723 – his supervisor being Johann Franz Encke.

From 1844 he worked at the New Berlin Observatory, whose first director was Encke. In 1885 he was awarded the Valz Prize from the French Academy of Sciences for his work on sunspots.
