= Maunder Minimum =

Period of low solar activity, 1645–1715

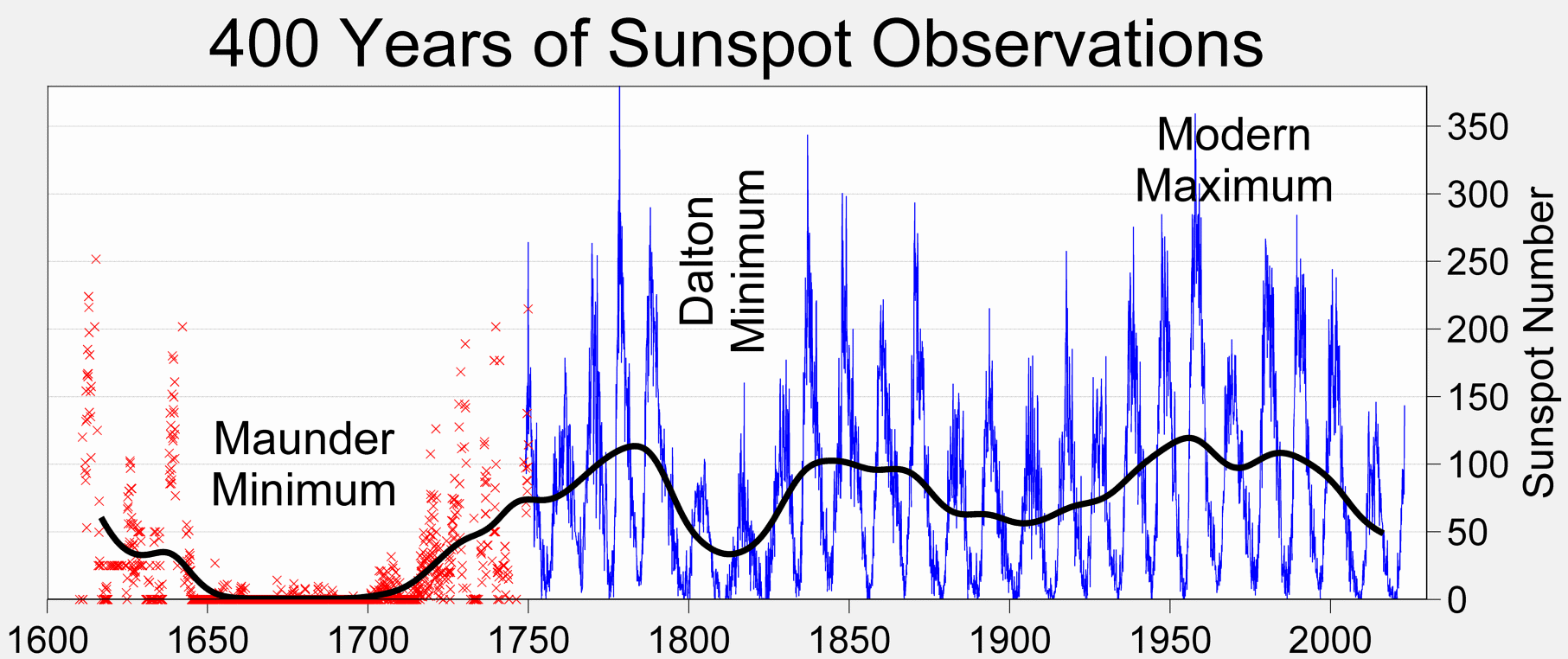
The Maunder Minimum shown in a 400-year history of sunspot numbers

The Maunder Minimum, also known as the "prolonged sunspot minimum", was a period around 1645 to 1715 during which sunspots became exceedingly rare. During the 28-year period 1672–1699 within the minimum, observations revealed fewer than 50 sunspots. This contrasts with the typical 40,000–50,000 sunspots seen in modern times over a similar timespan.

The Maunder Minimum was first noted by Gustav Spörer in publications in 1887 and 1889, work that was relayed to the Royal Astronomical Society in London, and then expanded on, by solar astronomers Edward Walter Maunder (1851–1928), and his wife Annie Russell Maunder (1868–1947), who also studied how sunspot latitudes changed with time. Two papers were published in Edward Maunder's name in 1890 and 1894, and he cited the two earlier papers written by Gustav Spörer. Because Annie Maunder had not received a university degree, restrictions at the time caused her contribution not to be publicly recognized. The term Maunder Minimum was popularised by John A. Eddy, who published a landmark paper in Science in 1976.

The Maunder Minimum occurred within the Little Ice Age, a long period (c. 1300 – c. 1850) of lower-than-average European temperatures. The reduced solar activity may have contributed to the climatic cooling, although the cooling began before the solar minimum and its primary cause is believed to be volcanic activity.

== Sunspot observations ==
Unsolved problem in astronomy
What caused the Maunder Minimum and other grand minima, and how does the solar cycle recover from a minimum state?
More unsolved problems in astronomy

The Maunder Minimum occurred between 1645 and 1715 when very few sunspots were observed. That was not because of a lack of observations, as during the 17th century, Giovanni Domenico Cassini carried out a systematic program of solar observations at the Paris Observatory, thanks to the astronomers Jean Picard and Philippe de La Hire. Johannes Hevelius also performed observations on his own. Here is the total of sunspots recorded, by example, in the decennial years (omitting Wolf numbers):

Year	Sunspots
1610	9
1620	6
1630	9
1640	0
1650	3
1660	Some sunspots (< 20) reported by Jan Heweliusz in Machina Coelestis
1670	0
1680	1 huge sunspot observed by Giovanni Domenico Cassini

During the Maunder Minimum enough sunspots were sighted that 11-year cycles could be determined from the count. The maxima occurred in 1676–1677, 1684, 1695, 1705 and 1718. Sunspot activity was then concentrated in the southern hemisphere of the Sun, except for the last cycle when the sunspots appeared in the northern hemisphere. According to Spörer's law, spots appear at high latitudes at the start of a cycle, subsequently moving to lower latitudes until they average about latitude 15° at solar maximum. The average then continues to drift lower to about 7° and after that, while spots of the old cycle fade, new cycle spots start appearing again at high latitudes. The visibility of these spots is also affected by the velocity of the Sun's surface rotation at various latitudes:

Solar latitude	Rotation period (days)
0°	24.7
35°	26.7
40°	28.0
75°	33.0

Visibility is somewhat affected by observations being done from the ecliptic. The ecliptic is inclined 7° from the plane of the Sun's equator (latitude 0°).

== Eclipses during the Maunder Minimum ==
In his highly influential paper, John A. Eddy discussed solar eclipses during the Maunder Minimum. From text of eye-witness reports of events in 1652, 1706 and 1715, he concluded that the solar corona was weak in intensity and unstructured during the Maunder Minimum. However, no graphical evidence of these events was available to him. A few representations of these events were available in political cartoons and on coins and medals but these were, almost certainly, not drawn by observers who had actually witnessed the events. There were two prints made by witnesses of the 1706 event but these were made for commercial reasons and not by trained astronomers. Then in 2012 Markus Heinz of the Berlin State Library discovered two paintings of the 1706 eclipse that were known to have existed but were thought lost. They were painted by a trained and skilful astronomer and observer, Maria Clara Eimmart, the daughter of the director of an observatory housed on a bastion of the walls of Nuremberg Castle. The paintings were in excellent agreement with detailed text description of the event by Johann Philipp Wurzelbau (also in Nuremberg) and by French mathematician and cartographer Jean de Clapiès and astronomer François de Plantade who observed the same event from the Babote Tower in Montpellier. This confirmed Eddy's conclusion about a weak and structureless corona during the Maunder minimum and agreed with simulations of the structureless F-corona, with no detected K-corona that is ordered by the magnetic field, as has been modelled for low coronal magnetic flux. A full discussion of these observations of the Maunder minimum corona and how the K-corona had partially returned by the time of the 1715 event is given by Hayakawa et al. (2020).

== Little Ice Age ==
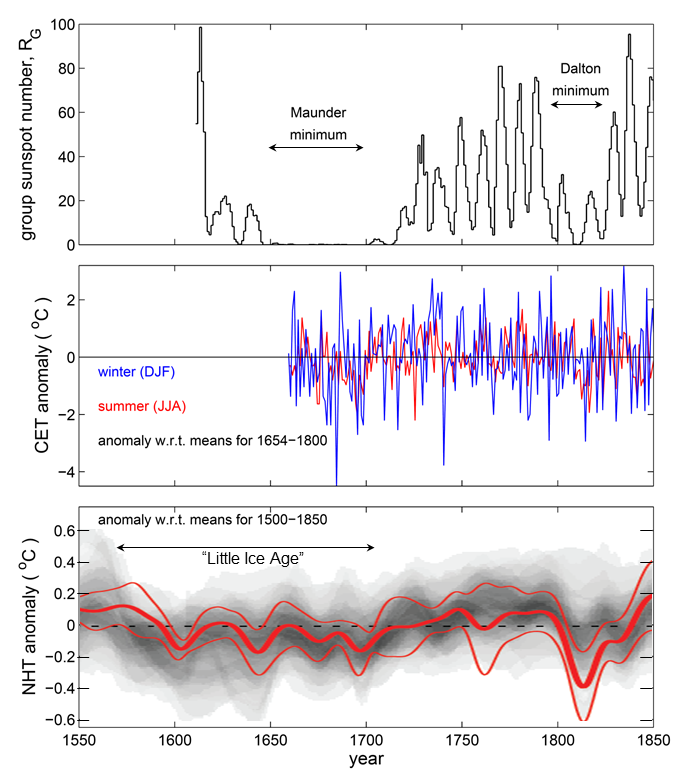
Comparison of group sunspot numbers (top), Central England Temperature (CET) observations (middle) and reconstructions and modeling of Northern Hemisphere Temperatures (NHT). The CET in red are summer averages (for June, July and August) and in blue winter averages (for December of previous year, January and February). NHT in grey is the distribution from basket of paleoclimate reconstructions (darker grey showing higher probability values) and in red are from model simulations that account for solar and volcanic variations. By way of comparison, on the same scales the anomaly for modern data (after 31 December 1999) for summer CET is +0.65 °C, for winter CET is +1.34 °C, and for NHT is +1.08 °C. Sunspot data are as in supplementary data to and Central England Temperature data are as published by the UK Met Office The NHT data are described in box TS.5, Figure 1 of the IPCC AR5 report of Working Group 1.

The Maunder Minimum roughly coincided with the middle part of the Little Ice Age, during which Europe and North America experienced colder than average temperatures. Whether there is a causal relationship, however, is still under evaluation. The current best hypothesis for the cause of the Little Ice Age is that it was the result of volcanic action. The onset of the Little Ice Age also occurred well before the beginning of the Maunder Minimum, and northern-hemisphere temperatures during the Maunder Minimum were not significantly different from the previous 80 years, suggesting a decline in solar activity was not the main causal driver of the Little Ice Age.

The correlation between low sunspot activity and cold winters in England has been analyzed using the longest existing surface temperature record, the Central England Temperature record. A potential explanation of this has been offered by observations by NASA's Solar Radiation and Climate Experiment, which suggest that solar ultraviolet light output is more variable over the course of the solar cycle than scientists had previously thought. A 2011 study found that low solar activity was linked to jet stream behavior, resulting in mild winters in some places (southern Europe and Canada/Greenland) and colder winters in others (northern Europe and the United States). In Europe, examples of very cold winters are 1683–84, 1694–95, and the winter of 1708–09.

== Other observations ==
Solar activity events recorded in radiocarbon.

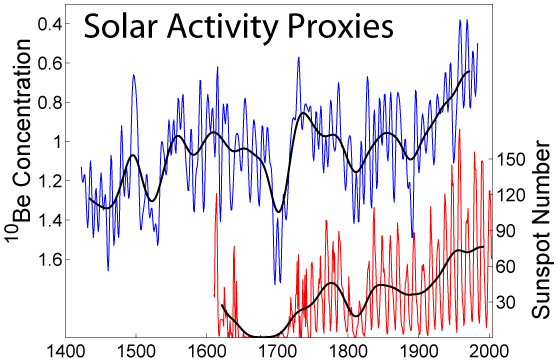
Graph showing proxies of solar activity, including changes in sunspot number and cosmogenic isotope production.

Past solar activity may be recorded by various proxies, including carbon-14 and beryllium-10. These indicate lower solar activity during the Maunder Minimum. The scale of changes resulting in the production of carbon-14 in one cycle is small (about one percent of medium abundance) and can be taken into account when radiocarbon dating is used to determine the age of archaeological artifacts. The interpretation of the beryllium-10 and carbon-14 cosmogenic isotope abundance records stored in terrestrial reservoirs such as ice sheets and tree rings has been greatly aided by reconstructions of solar and heliospheric magnetic fields based on historic data on geomagnetic storm activity, which bridge the time gap between the end of the usable cosmogenic isotope data and the start of modern spacecraft data.

Other historical sunspot minima have been detected either directly or by the analysis of the cosmogenic isotopes; these include the Spörer Minimum (1450–1540), and less markedly the Dalton Minimum (1790–1820). In a 2012 study, sunspot minima have been detected by analysis of carbon-14 in lake sediments. In total, there seem to have been 18 periods of sunspot minima in the last 8,000 years, and studies indicate that the Sun currently spends up to a quarter of its time in these minima.

A paper based on an analysis of a drawing by John Flamsteed suggests that the Sun's surface rotation slowed in the deep Maunder Minimum (1684).

During the Maunder Minimum aurorae had been observed seemingly normally, with a regular decadal-scale cycle. This is somewhat surprising because the later, and less deep, Dalton sunspot minimum is clearly seen in auroral occurrence frequency, at least at lower geomagnetic latitudes. Because geomagnetic latitude is an important factor in auroral occurrence, (lower-latitude aurorae requiring higher levels of solar-terrestrial activity) it becomes important to allow for population migration and other factors that may have influenced the number of reliable auroral observers at a given magnetic latitude for the earlier dates. Decadal-scale cycles during the Maunder Minimum can also be seen in the abundances of the beryllium-10 cosmogenic isotope (which unlike carbon-14 can be studied with annual resolution) but these appear to be in antiphase with any remnant sunspot activity. An explanation in terms of solar cycles in loss of solar magnetic flux was proposed in 2012.

The fundamental papers on the Maunder Minimum have been published in Case studies on the Spörer, Maunder and Dalton Minima.

== See also ==
- Global warming
- Modern Maximum
- Solar minimum
- Starspot Maunder minimum
