= Solar cycle 24 =

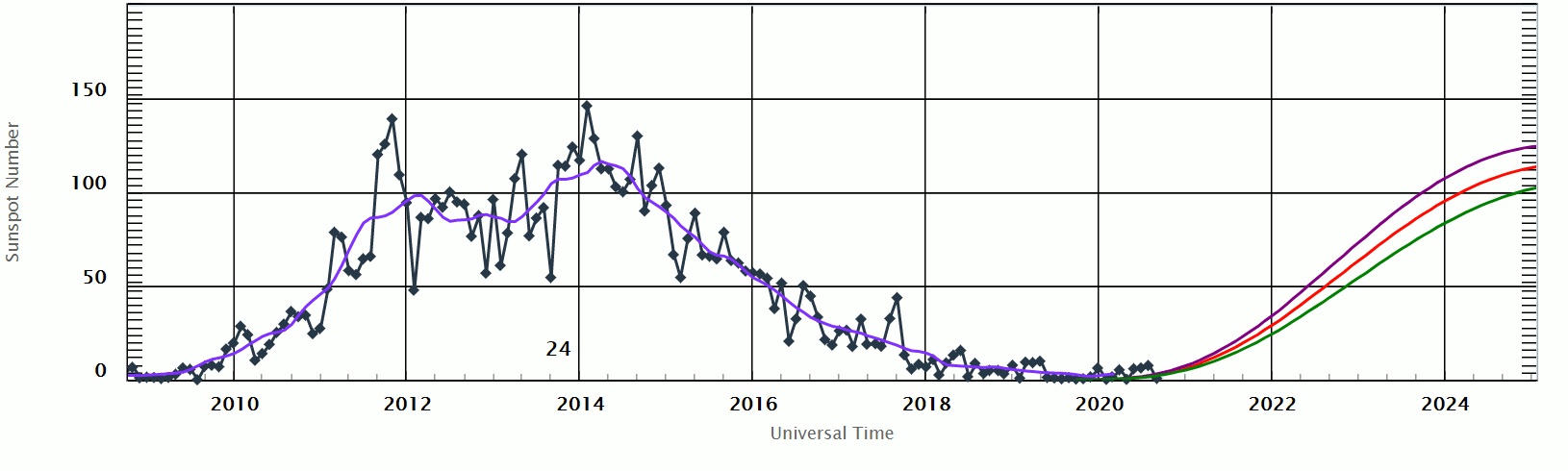
- ISES Solar Cycle 24 Sunspot Number Progression

Sunspot data
- Start date: December 2008
- End date: December 2019
- Duration (years): 11.0
- Max count: 81.8
- Max count month: April 2014
- Min count: 2.2
- Spotless days: 489

Cycle chronology
- Previous cycle: Solar cycle 23 (1996-2008)
- Next cycle: Solar cycle 25 (2019-present)

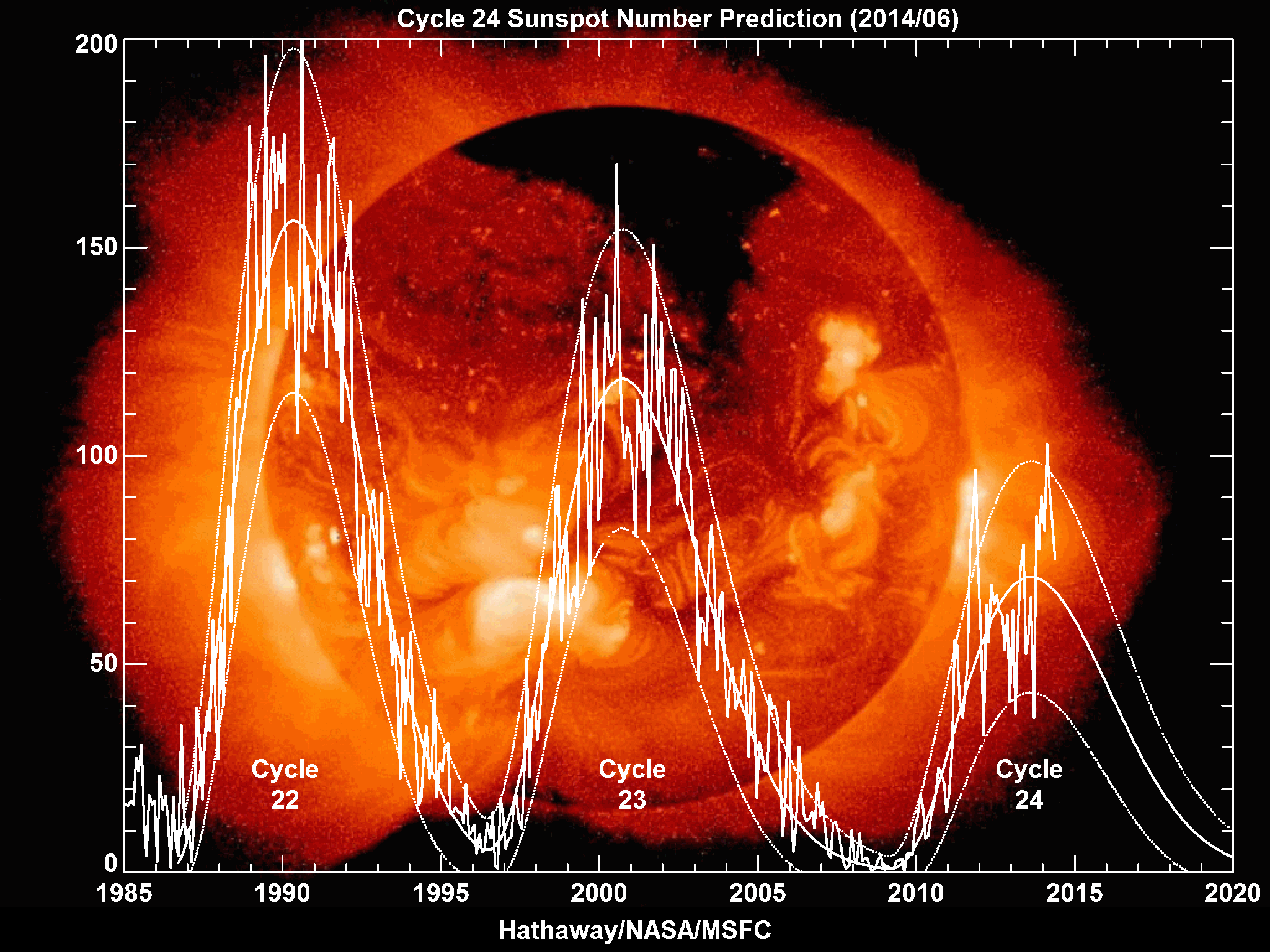
NASA Solar Cycle 24 Sunspot Number Prediction

Solar cycle 24 is the most recently completed solar cycle, the 24th since 1755, when extensive recording of solar sunspot activity began. It began in December 2008 with a minimum smoothed sunspot number of 2.2, and ended in December 2019. Activity was minimal until early 2010. It reached its maximum in April 2014 with a 23 months smoothed sunspot number of 81.8. This maximum value was substantially lower than other recent solar cycles, down to a level which had not been seen since cycles 12 to 15 (1878-1923).

== Predictions ==
Prior to the minimum between the end of Solar Cycle 23 and the beginning of Solar Cycle 24, two theories predicted how strong Solar Cycle 24 would be. One camp postulated that the Sun retained a long memory (Solar Cycle 24 would be active) while the other asserted that it had a short memory (quiet). Prior to 2006, the difference was substantial with a minority of researchers predicting "the smallest solar cycle in 100 years." Another group of researchers, including one at NASA, predicted that it "looks like its going to be one of the most intense cycles since record-keeping began almost 400 years ago."

The delayed onset of high latitude spots indicating the start of Solar Cycle 24 led the "active cycle" researchers to revise their predictions downward and the consensus by 2007 was split 5-4 in favor of a smaller cycle. By 2012, consensus was a small cycle, as solar cycles are much more predictable 3 years after minima.

In May 2009 the NOAA Space Weather Prediction Center's Solar Cycle 24 Prediction Panel predicted the cycle to peak at 90 sunspots in May 2013. In May 2012 NASA's expert David Hathaway predicted a peak in Spring of 2013 with about 60 sunspots.

NASA funded and used Ken Schatten's physics-based models, which utilized a solar Dynamo model, to accurately predict the low. This method used the correlation between solar magnetic field strength at solar minimum to sunspot number at solar maximum to accurately predict the peak solar flux of each of the last three solar cycles. Schatten's predictions become accurate as early as solar minima, 5–6 years before solar max.

== Results ==
In early 2013, after several months of calm, it was obvious that the active 2011 was not a prelude to a widely predicted late 2012-early 2013 peak in solar flares, sunspots and other activity. This unexpected stage prompted some scientists to propose a "double-peaked" solar maximum, which then occurred. The first peak reached 99 in 2011 and the second peak came in early 2014 at 101.

== Speculation ==
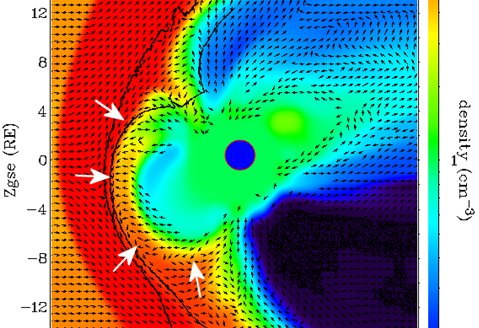
The 2008 breach of Earth's magnetic shield

According to NASA, the intensity of geomagnetic storms during Solar Cycle 24 may be elevated in some areas where the Earth's magnetic field is weaker than expected. This fact was discovered by the THEMIS spacecraft in 2008. A 20-fold increase in particle counts that penetrate the Earth's magnetic field may be expected. Solar Cycle 24 has been the subject of various hypotheses and commentary pertaining to its potential effects on Earth.

While acknowledging that the next solar maximum will not necessarily produce unusual geomagnetic activity, astrophysicist Michio Kaku took advantage of the media focus on the 2012 phenomenon to draw attention to the need to develop strategies for coping with the terrestrial damage that such an event could inflict. He asserted that governments should ensure the integrity of electrical infrastructure, so as to prevent a recurrence of disruption akin to that caused by the solar storm of 1859.

The current solar cycle is currently the subject of research, as it is not generating sunspots in the expected manner. Sunspots did not begin to appear immediately after the last minimum (in 2008) and although they started to reappear in late 2009, they were at significantly lower rates than anticipated.

On April 19, 2012, the National Astronomical Observatory of Japan predicted that the Sun's magnetic field would assume a quadrupole configuration.

Throughout 2012, NASA posted news releases discrediting the 2012 phenomenon and the so-called Mayan prophecy, delinking them from solar activity and space weather.

== Events ==
Solar flares by year
- M5-M9
- X1-X5
- X5-X9

The strongest flares of Solar Cycle 24 (above M5.0 class) and related events
Class	Year	Date	Sunspot region	Radio B.	SR Storm	CME	GM Storm
X9.33	2017	Sep 6	2673	R3	S1	Yes	-
X8.2	2017	Sep 10	2673	R3	S3	Yes	-
X6.9	2011	Aug 9	1263	R3	S1	Yes	-
X5.4	2012	Mar 7	1429	R3	S3	Yes	G3
X4.9	2014	Feb 25	1990	R3	S1	Yes	G2
X3.3	2013	Nov 5	1890	R3	-	Yes	-
X3.2	2013	May 14	1748	R3	-	Yes	-
X3.19	2014	Oct 24	2192	R3	-	No	-
X2.8	2013	May 13	1748	R3	-	Yes	-
X2.74	2015	May 5	2339	R3	-	Yes	-
X2.3	2013	Oct 29	1875	R3	-	Yes	-
X2.2	2011	Feb 15	1158	R3	-	Yes	G1
X2.2	2014	Jun 10	2087	R3	-	?	-
X2.2	2015	Mar 11	2297	R3	-	Yes	-
X2.2	2017	Sep 6	2673	R3	-	?	-
X2.1	2013	Oct 25	1882	R3	-	Yes	-
X2.1	2011	Sep 6	1283	R3	S1	Yes	G3
X2.0	2014	Oct 26	2192	R3	-	No	-
X2.0	2014	Oct 27	2192	R3	-	No	-
X1.9	2011	Nov 3	1339	R3	-	Yes	-
X1.9	2011	Sep 24	1302	R3	S1	Yes	G4
X1.8	2011	Sep 7	1283	R3	S1	Yes	G1
X1.8	2012	Oct 23	1598	R3	-	No	-
X1.8	2014	Dec 20	2242	R3	-	Yes	-
X1.7	2013	Oct 25	1882	R3	-	Yes	-
X1.7	2012	Jan 27	1402	R3	S2	Yes	-
X1.7	2013	May 13	1748	R3	-	Yes	-
X1.66	2014	Sep 10	2158	R3	S2	Yes	G3
X1.6	2014	Oct 22	2192	R3	-	No	-
X1.5	2011	Mar 9	1166	R3	-	Yes	G2
X1.5	2014	Jun 10	2087	R3	-	?	-
X1.4	2011	Sep 22	1302	R3	-	Yes	-
X1.4	2012	Jul 12	1520	R3	S1	Yes	G2
X1.3	2012	Mar 7	1430	R3	S3	No	-
X1.3	2014	Apr 25	2035	R3	-	?	-
X1.3	2017	Sep 7	2673	R3	S2	No	G4
X1.2	2014	Jan 7	1944	R3	S2	Yes	-
X1.2	2013	May 15	1748	R3	S1	Yes	G1
X1.1	2012	Mar 5	1429	R3	-	Yes	G2
X1.1	2012	Jul 6	1515	R3	S1	Yes	G1
X1.1	2013	Nov 8	1890	R3	-	Yes	-
X1.1	2013	Nov 10	1890	R3	-	Yes	-
X1.1	2014	Oct 19	2192	R3	-	No	-
X1.0	2013	Nov 19	1893	R3	S1	Yes	-
X1.0	2013	Oct 28	1875	R3	S1	Yes	-
X1.0	2014	Mar 29	2017	R3	-	?	-
X1.0	2014	Jun 11	2087	R3	-	?	-
X1.0	2014	Oct 25	2192	R3	-	No	-
M9.9	2014	Jan 1	1936	R2	-	Yes	-
M9.3	2013	Oct 24	1877	R2	-	Yes	-
M9.3	2011	Aug 4	1261	R2	S1	Yes	G4
M9.3	2011	Jul 30	1260	R2	-	No	-
M9.3	2014	Mar 12	1996	R2	-	?	-
M9.2	2015	Mar 7	2339	R2	-	Yes	-
M9.0	2012	Oct 20	1598	R2	-	Yes	-
M8.7	2012	Jan 23	1402	R2	S3	Yes	G1
M8.7	2014	Oct 22	2192	R2	-	No	-
M8.7	2014	Dec 17	2242	R2	-	Yes	-
M8.4	2012	Mar 10	1429	R2	-	Yes	-
M8.3	2010	Feb 12	1046	R2	-	Yes	-
M8.2	2015	Mar 3	2290	R2	-	Yes	-
M8.1	2017	Sep 8	2673	R2	-	?	-
M7.9	2012	Mar 13	1429	R2	S2	Yes	G2
M7.9	2014	Nov 5	2205	R2	-	Yes	-
M7.9	2015	Jun 25	2371	R2	S1	Yes	G2
M7.7	2012	Jul 19	1520	R2	-	Yes	-
M7.6	2015	Sep 28	2422	R2	-	?	-
M7.6	2016	Jul 23	2567	R2	-	Yes	-
M7.4	2011	Sep 25	1302	R2	-	Yes	G1
M7.3	2014	Apr 18	2036	R2	S1	?	-
M7.3	2014	Oct 2	2173	R2	-	Yes	-
M7.3	2017	Sep 7	2673	R2	-	?	-
M7.2	2014	Jan 7	1944	R2	-	No	-
M7.1	2011	Sep 24	1302	R2	-	Yes	G4
M7.1	2014	Oct 27	2192	R2	-	?	-
M6.9	2012	Jul 8	1515	R2	S1	Yes	-
M6.9	2014	Dec 18	2241	R2	-	Yes	
M6.7	2011	Sep 8	1283	R2	-	Yes	G1
M6.7	2014	Oct 27	2192	R2	-	?	-
M6.7	2016	Apr 18	2529	R2	-	Yes	-
M6.6	2011	Feb 13	1158	R2	-	Yes	-
M6.6	2011	Feb 18	1158	R2	-	No	-
M6.6	2014	Jan 30	1967	R2	-	Yes	-
M6.6	2014	Oct 28	2192	R2	-	?	-
M6.6	2015	Jun 22	2371	R2	S2	Yes	G4
M6.5	2013	Apr 11	1719	R2	S2	Yes	-
M6.5	2014	Apr 2	2027	R2	-	?	-
M6.5	2014	Jul 8	2113	R2	-	?	-
M6.5	2014	Nov 3	2205	R2	S1	Yes	-
M6.4	2010	Feb 7	1045	R2	-	Yes	-
M6.4	2013	Dec 31	1936	R2	-	Yes	-
M6.3	2013	Nov 1	1884	R2	-	Yes	-
M6.3	2012	Mar 9	1429	R2	-	Yes	G2
M6.1	2012	Jul 5	1515	R2	-	No	-
M6.1	2012	Jul 28	1532	R2	-	Yes	-
M6.1	2014	Dec 4	2222	R2	-	Yes	-
M6.0	2012	Nov 13	1613	R2	-	Yes	-
M6.0	2011	Aug 3	1261	R2	-	Yes	G4
M5.9	2013	Jun 7	1762	R2	-	Yes	-
M5.9	2014	Aug 24	2151	R2	-	?	-
M5.8	2011	Sep 24	1302	R2	-	?	-
M5.8	2015	Mar 9	2297	R2	-	Yes	-
M5.7	2012	May 10	1476	R2	-	Yes	-
M5.7	2013	May 3	1739	R2	-	Yes	-
M5.7	2014	Nov 16	2209	R2	-	?	-
M5.7	2017	Apr 2	2644	R2	-	No	-
M5.6	2012	Jul 2	1515	R2	-	Yes	-
M5.6	2015	Jan 13	2257	R2	-	No	-
M5.6	2015	Aug 24	2403	R2	-	?	-
M5.5	2012	Aug 18	1548	R2	-	No	-
M5.5	2015	Oct 2	2422	R2	-	?	-
M5.5	2016	Jul 23	2567	R2	-	Yes	-
M5.5	2017	Sep 4	2673	R2	-	?	-
M5.4	2010	Nov 6	1121	R2	-	?	-
M5.4	2014	Nov 6	2205	R2	-	?	-
M5.3	2011	Sep 6	1283	R2	-	Yes	G3
M5.3	2011	Mar 8	1165	R2	-	Yes	G1
M5.3	2012	Jul 4	1515	R2	-	Yes	-
M5.3	2014	May 8	2056	R2	-	?	G1
M5.3	2017	Apr 2	2644	R2	-	No	-
M5.2	2014	Feb 4	1967	R2	-	?	-
M5.1	2012	May 17	1476	R2	S2	Yes	-
M5.1	2013	Oct 28	1875	R2	-	Yes	-
M5.1	2014	Sep 28	2173	R2	-	Yes	-
M5.1	2015	Mar 10	2297	R2	-	Yes	-
Source: Solarham.com and NOAA's SWPC. The CME field indicates whether the solar flare hurled a CME (oriented or not to Earth). The Radio B./SR Storm/GM Storm fields indicate the NOAA scales of radio blackouts/solar radiation storms/geomagnetic storms, being G1 (minor), G2 (moderate), G3 (strong), G4 (severe) and G5 (extreme).

=== 2008 ===
Solar flares in 2008
- C
- M
- X

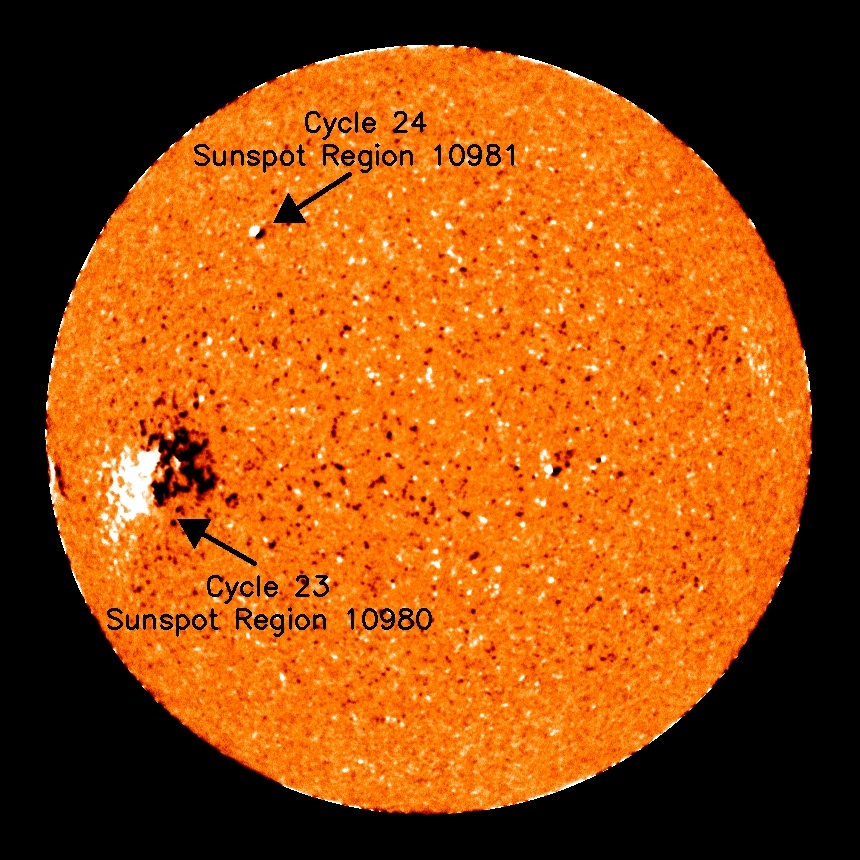
Magnetogram showing the magnetic polarity of AR10981 (labeled as sunspot region 10981) compared to an active region from solar cycle 23.

On 4 January 2008, an active region appeared with magnetic polarity reversed compared to that expected by Hale's law for solar cycle 23. This presaged the start of solar cycle 24—though did not mark its official beginning. The region was located at the relatively high latitude 30° N which, according to Spörer's law, provided further evidence for the arrival of cycle 24. The NOAA assigned it the active region number AR10981.

Only a few sunspots were observed on the surface of the Sun throughout 2008. The smoothed monthly sunspot number reached a minimum of 2.2 in December 2008, therefore an international panel of scientists declared that month as solar minimum and the beginning of Solar Cycle 24.

=== 2009 ===
Solar flares in 2009
- C
- M
- X

Solar activity remained extremely low throughout 2009. The observed monthly sunspots exceeded 10 only in December.

=== 2010 ===
Solar flares in 2010
- C
- M
- X

On 19 January 2010, active region AR11041 produced an M2.3-class flare, the first flare of cycle 24 above M-class. It was followed by an M1.7-class flare seven hours later and four consecutive M-class flares the next day. Among the four flares, the strongest reached a strength of M3.4.

On 12 February 2010, active region AR11046 produced an M8.3-class flare. Later in the month, active regions AR11045 and AR11046 unleashed a total of nine M-class flares.

On 5 April 2010, the first coronal mass ejection (CME) of cycle 24 erupted at an active region causing a G3 (strong) geomagnetic storm on Earth. The Kp index, which quantifies disturbances in the horizontal component of Earth's magnetic field, reached a value of 7.

Video captured by NASA'sof the initial ejection taken August 1, 2010.

The coronal mass ejection starts at 2:36 UTC and ends at 3:56 UTC on August 1, 2010 in this animation on STEREO Ahead images.

On 1 and 2 August 2010, a series of four large CMEs were observed erupting from the Sun's Earth-facing side. These CMEs were likely connected to a C3.2-class flare from active region AR11092 despite the CMEs taking place about 400,000 km apart from the region. On 4 August 2010, a G2 (moderate) geomagnetic storm caused aurorae to be visible in the northern hemisphere at latitudes as far south as 45° N near Michigan and Wisconsin in the United States, and Ontario, Canada. European observers reported sightings as far south as Denmark near latitude 56° N. The aurorae were reportedly green in color due to the interaction of the solar particles with oxygen atoms in the relatively denser atmosphere of southern latitudes.

On 14 August 2010, a C4.4-class flare produced the first solar radiation storm of cycle 24. The proton storm event was minor, rating at S1, and was easily absorbed by the Earth's ionosphere.

On 6 November 2010, active region AR11121 emitted an M5.4 flare.

=== 2011 ===
Solar flares in 2011
- C
- M
- X

==== February ====
===== 'Valentine’s Day' 2011 flare =====
Peaking at 01:56 UT on February 15, 2011, sunspot group 1158 produced an X2.2-class solar flare. Dubbed the Valentine's Day solar event by the scientific community, it was the first Solar Cycle 24 flare reaching X class level. In fact, it was the first of its class since December 2006. NOAA issued an R3 (strong) radio blackout alert pertaining this prominent x-ray flux event. In addition to flashing Earth with X and UV radiation, the explosion also hurled a CME in Earth's direction. The magnetosphere was impacted on February 18. The CME struck a minor G1-level geomagnetic storm.
Shortly before, on February 13, sunspot 1158 had unleashed an M6.6-class solar flare. On February 18, the same active region produced another x-ray burst with the same strength. 13 M-class bursts were registered in February 2011.

==== March ====
A CME exploded from the vicinity of sunspot 1164 during the late hours of March 7, 2011. It leapt away from the Sun traveling ~2200 km/s, making it the fastest CME since September 2005.
On March 9, active region 1166 erupted in an X1.5 flare. An R3-level radio blackout was reported. The related CME caused a G2 geomagnetic storm two days later. 21 M-class flares were registered this month.

==== July ====
Sunspot 1260 produced an M9.3-class solar flare on July 30, 2011. Because of its brevity, the eruption did not hurl a substantial cloud of ionized material or CME toward Earth, so it was not geoeffective.

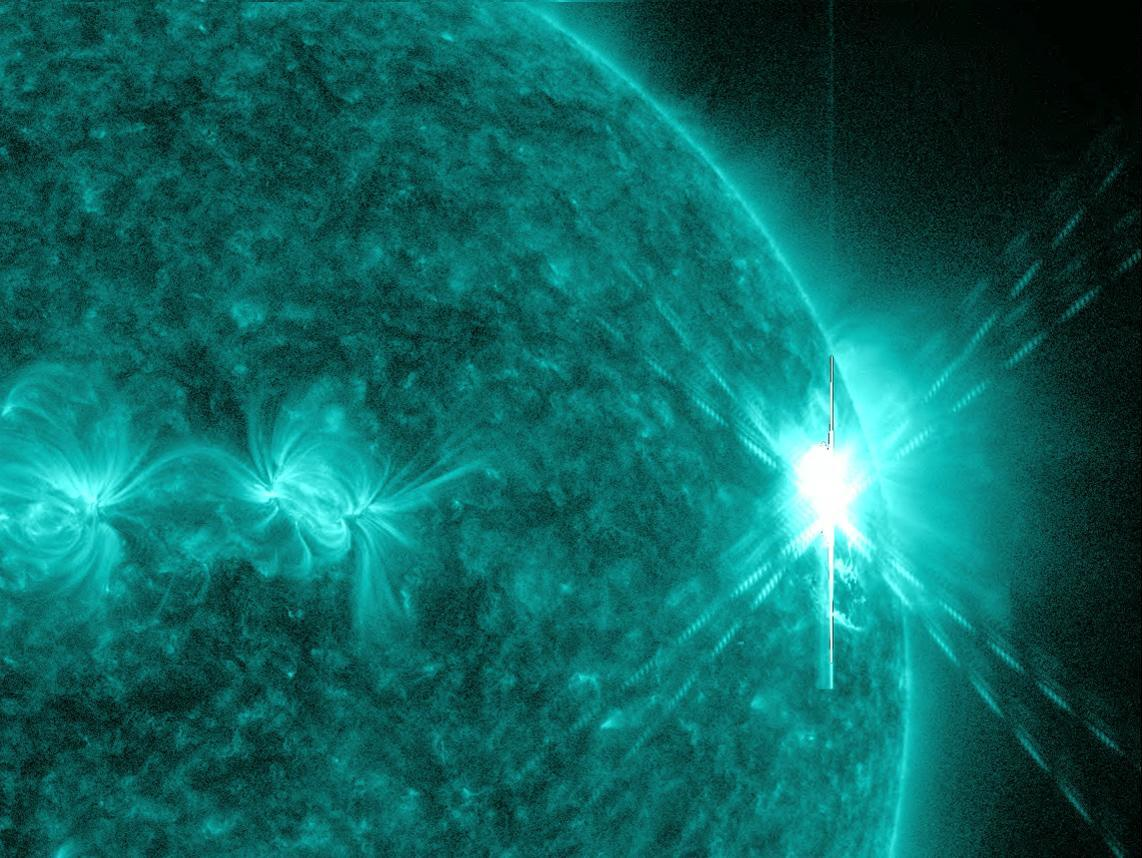
The Aug 9, 2011 X6.9-class flare, taken by NASA's Solar Dynamics Observatory (SDO) in extreme UV light at 131 Angstroms.

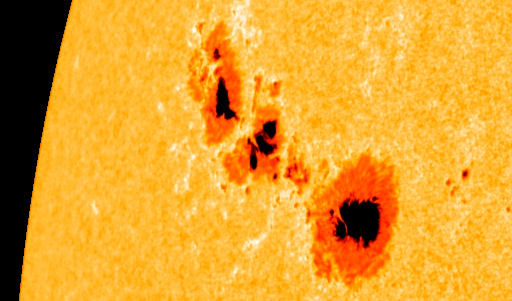
The active region 1302, responsible for two X-class flares in Sep 22 and 24, 2011. Image taken that month by NASA's SDO.

==== August ====
On August 5, 2011, the combined cloud of three consecutive CMEs produced brilliant aurorae, reported as far south as Oklahoma and Alabama. The geomagnetic storm reached a G4 (severe) level, enough to create power outages. It was one of the strongest geomagnetic storms in years. In the southern hemisphere, aurorae could be seen as far north as South Africa, Southern Chile and Southern Australia. The CMEs were hurled by three M-class flares erupting in active sunspot 1261: M1.4 on August 2, M6.0 on August 3 and M9.3 on August 4.

===== X6.9-class flare =====
On August 9 at 08:05 UT, sunspot 1263 produced a massive X6.9-class solar flare, the third X-flare of Solar Cycle 24 and the most powerful so far (as of May 2013). There was also a CME associated with this burst. Although the flare was not Earth-directed, radiation created waves of ionization in Earth's upper atmosphere, briefly disrupting communications at some VLF and HF radio frequencies. An R3-level (strong) radio blackout alert was issued. A proton event greater than 10 MeV (million electron volts) and exceeding 10 pfu (proton flux units) was also reported, so an S1-level solar radiation storm was also issued.

==== September ====
Sunspot 1283 erupted with an M5.3-class solar flare on September 6 at 01:50 UT. An R2 (moderate) blackout radio alert was issued. The burst was Earth-directed. Just 21 hours later, an X2.1-class flare – some four times stronger than the earlier flare – erupted from the same sunspot region. NOAA detected an R3 (strong) radio blackout and an S1 (minor) solar radiation storm. The combined CMEs of these bursts arrived at Earth on September 9, provoking a G3 (strong) geomagnetic storm.

The next day, September 7, an X1.8-class solar flare erupted from sunspot 1283, producing an S1 solar radiation storm. A fourth flare, an M6-class, was ejected by the same sunspot on September 8.

This sequence of flares produced waves of ionization in Earth's upper atmosphere, briefly altering the propagation of low-frequency radio signals around Earth. Moreover, the eruptions hurled clouds of plasma in its direction. CME impacts, strong geomagnetic storms and aurorae were registered from September 9 onwards.

Then, on September 22, an X1.4-class solar flare erupted out of sunspot 1302. An R3-level radio blackout was registered. The blast produced a significant CME, but was not Earth directed. Two days later, an X1.9-class flare, followed in the next 31 hours by a spectacular string of 14 M-class flares, the biggest being two M7 flares, was mostly unleashed out of the same sunspot. The first two explosions, X1.9 and M7.1, propelled a pair of closely spaced CMEs. A G4 (severe) geomagnetic storm was reported on September 26.

In total, the Sun produced four X flares and 31 M flares in September 2011, one of the most active months of Solar Cycle 24 so far.

==== October ====
The Sun unleashed eight M-class flares this month, being the strongest the M3.9 event, followed by an Earth-directed CME, produced by sunspot 1305 on October 2. Just in the eve, sunspots 1302 and 1305 had emitted flares almost at the same time; the first event was a C-class and the second one reached a M1.2 category. This double eruption, which hurled a double CME as well, were particularly interesting as coincided with the arrival of a comet, discovered by amateur astronomers the previous day, that disintegrated in spectacular fashion when it plunged into the Sun. A very similar scenario happened on May 10–11, 2011.

==== November ====
On November 3, 2011, active region 1339, one of the largest sunspots in years - 40,000 km wide and at least twice that in length - unleashed an X1.9-class solar flare. Waves of ionization in the upper atmosphere created an R3 (strong) radio blackout. The related CME was not headed for Earth. 13 M-class flares were registered this month. November 2011 may be considered the most active month of the current Cycle 24 so far, as monthly sunspot count was nearly 100 (96.7) and the same went for the F10.7 Solar Flux (the radio emission from the Sun at a wavelength of 10.7 cm) that racked up a value of 153.1. However, these numbers are well below those of Cycle 23 at its peak. Cycle 23 peak sunspot count was 170 and its F10.7 was about 235.

==== December ====
Solar activity increased again in late December, with the Sun unleashing eight M-flares. The most intense flare, produced by sunspot 1385, was an M4.0 event on December 25. The year 2011 ended up with 111 M-class and 8 X-class solar flares.

=== 2012 ===
Solar flares in 2012
- C
- M
- X

==== January ====
Active sunspot 1401 erupted an M3.2-class solar flare and a full-halo CME on January 19, 2012. The CME hit the Earth's magnetic field in the early hours of January 22, with minor geomagnetic disturbances reported.
Sunspot 1402 erupted a long-duration M8.7-class flare, followed by a CME, on January 23, 2012, at 03:59 UTC. According to NOAA, the flare's radiation storm was ranked as S3 (strong), the strongest since May 2005. The very fast-moving CME arrived at the Earth on January 24 at approximately 15:00 UTC. The geomagnetic storm reached a G1 level (minor), the same level recorded by the previous M3-class flare.

SOHO view of the Jan 23, 2012 M8.7 flare.

SDO shot of the Jan 23, 2012, M8.7 flare.

SDO shot of the Jan 23, 2012, M8.7 flare.

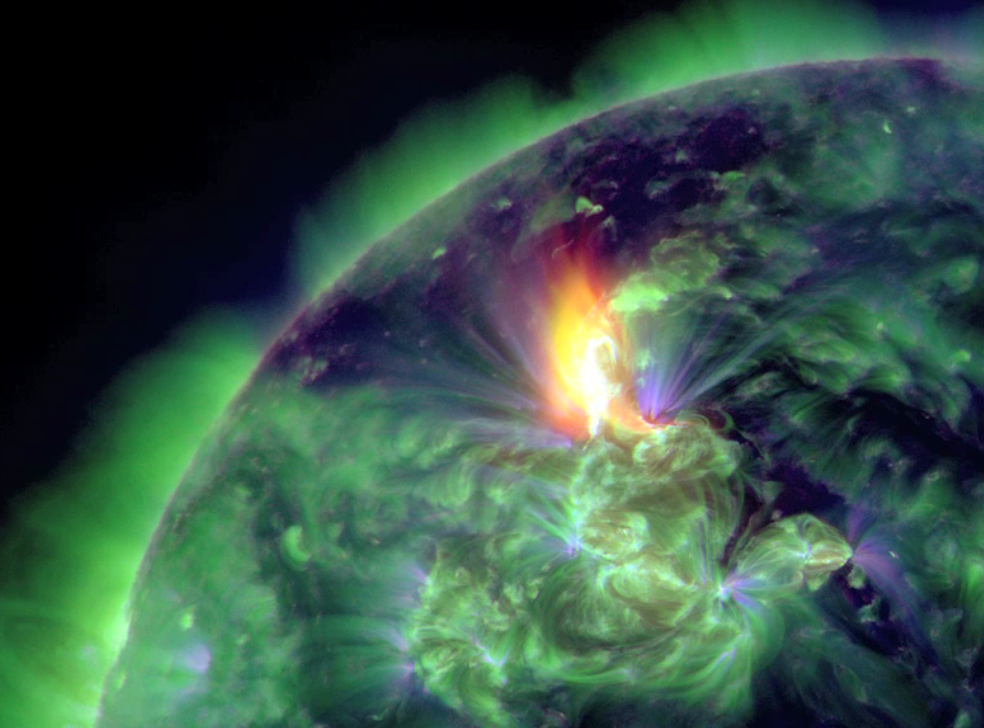
The M3.2 class solar flare of 19 January 2012, by SDO.

On January 27, at 18:37 UT, sunspot region 1402 unleashed an X1.7-class flare, prompting NOAA's Space Weather Prediction Center to issue an R3 (strong) Radio Blackout warning and an S2 (moderate) Solar Radiation Storm warning. Sunspot 1402 was rotating onto the far side of the Sun, so the blast site was not facing Earth. The explosion also produced a huge CME, but not Earth-oriented, so no geomagnetic storm was expected.

==== March ====
Enlil model for the March 2012 coronal mass ejection, plotted out to ten astronomical units (beyond the orbit of Saturn). The top view slices the data in the plane of the Earth's orbit and projects the planetary orbits onto that. The side view is a cross-section through the Sun-Earth line. The wedge-shape of the side view is because the ENLIL model only extends above and below the solar equator by 60 degrees.

Following several minor C-class flares, M-class flares and CMEs registered in previous days and weeks, active region 1429 erupted an X1.1-class flare on March 5 at 04:13 GMT. The wave of high energy electromagnetic rays, reaching Earth in minutes, caused an R3 (strong) radio blackout over China, India and Australia, according to NOAA. Sunspot region 1429, whose size was half of that of Jupiter and was rotating toward Earth, was being particularly active since it materialized on March 2. The CME that followed arrived at the Earth on March 7 and caused a G2 (moderate) geomagnetic storm. Just hours after ejecting the X1.1-class flare, it produced several minor C and M-class flares in quick succession.

===== X5.4-class flare =====
After releasing up to nine M-class flares in only one day, the active region 1429 erupted a powerful X5.4-class flare at 00:24 UTC on March 7. The related CME impacted the Earth on March 8, causing a G3 (strong) geomagnetic storm. This event marked the second strongest solar flare of Cycle 24 in terms of X-ray flux. NOAA launched R3 (strong) radio blackout and S3 (strong) solar radiation storm alerts. Just one hour after that first flare, nearby sunspot 1430 released a less powerful X1.3-class flare. No CME associated to this event was reported. Months later, in June, NASA reported that its Fermi Gamma-ray Space Telescope detected in this powerful flare the highest flux of gamma rays — greater than 100 MeV — ever associated with an eruption on the Sun.

AR1429, rotating toward the other side of the Sun, generated an M6.3-class flare on March 9, an M8.5 flare one day later and an M7.9 flare on March 13. These eruptions hurled CMEs, all Earth-oriented. The first wave of plasma impacted the magnetosphere on March 12, causing a G2 (moderate) geomagnetic storm. The second CME was not geoeffective. The third wave of ionized gas reached Earth on March 15, causing another G2 storm.

In late March, the US Air Force Space Command reported that the solar storms of March 7–10 could have temporarily knocked American military satellites offline. NASA also reported that these powerful flares heated the Earth's upper atmosphere with the biggest dose of infrared radiation since 2005. From March 8 to March 10, the thermosphere absorbed 26 billion kWh of energy. Infrared radiation from carbon dioxide and nitric oxide, the two most efficient coolants in the thermosphere, re-radiated 95% of that total back into space.

March 2012, one of the most active months of Solar Cycle 24, ended up with 19 M-class and three X-class flares.

Short video of the eruption beginning on April 16th 2012. The video begins in 304 Angstrom extreme ultraviolet and ends with 171 Angstrom.

==== April ====
A prominent eruption produced a CME off the east limb (left side) of the Sun on April 16, 2012. Such eruptions are often associated with solar flares, and in this case an M1.7-class (medium-sized) flare occurred at the same time, peaking at 1:45 PM EDT (17.45 UTC). The CME was not aimed toward Earth. Nevertheless, this month was very quiet in comparison to the previous one, as only two M-class flares were recorded.

==== May ====
Solar activity increased again this month, with 12 M-class flares ejected, the strongest being an M5.7 flare produced by active region 1476 on May 10. This so-called "monster" sunspot complex, the largest active region of the cycle to date, was about the size of Jupiter, or eleven times the diameter of Earth.

==== June ====
11 M-class solar flares were observed this month, the largest being an M3.3 flare.

==== July ====
An X1.1-class flare erupted from sunspot 1515 on July 6, generating an R3 (strong) radio blackout and an S1 (minor) solar storm; its related CME caused a G1 (minor) geomagnetic storm. Six days after, sunspot 1520, the largest active region of Solar Cycle 24 to date, unleashed an X1.4-class flare, peaking at 12:52 PM EDT. This huge group of sunspots, which rotated into view on July 6, was located in the center of the Sun at the time of this event. The related CME caused a G2 (moderate) geomagnetic storm, following an R3 radio blackout and an S1 solar storm.

Video of the July 12, 2012 X1.4 flare using SDO AIA footage in 131(teal), 171(gold) and 335 (blue) angstrom wavelengths.

The formation of the flux rope (lower right limb) that preceded the July 19, 2012 M7.7 flare.

The July 19, 2012 M7.7 flare.

The Sun emitted a moderate solar flare on July 19, 2012, beginning at 1:13 AM EDT and peaking at 1:58 AM. The flare was classified as an M7.7 flare. It was also emitted from sunspot 1520. Other M-class flares registered this month included an M6.9 (July 8, sunspot 1515), an M6.1 (July 5, sunspot 1515), an M6.1 (July 28, sunspot 1532), an M5.6 (July 2, sunspot 1515) and an M5.3 (July 4, sunspot 1515). The month ended up with 45 M-class flares and 2 X-class flares, which is the highest number of such flares within the current solar cycle to date. Nevertheless, July 2012 was not the most active month in solar radio flux and number of sunspots.

===== Solar storm of 2012 =====
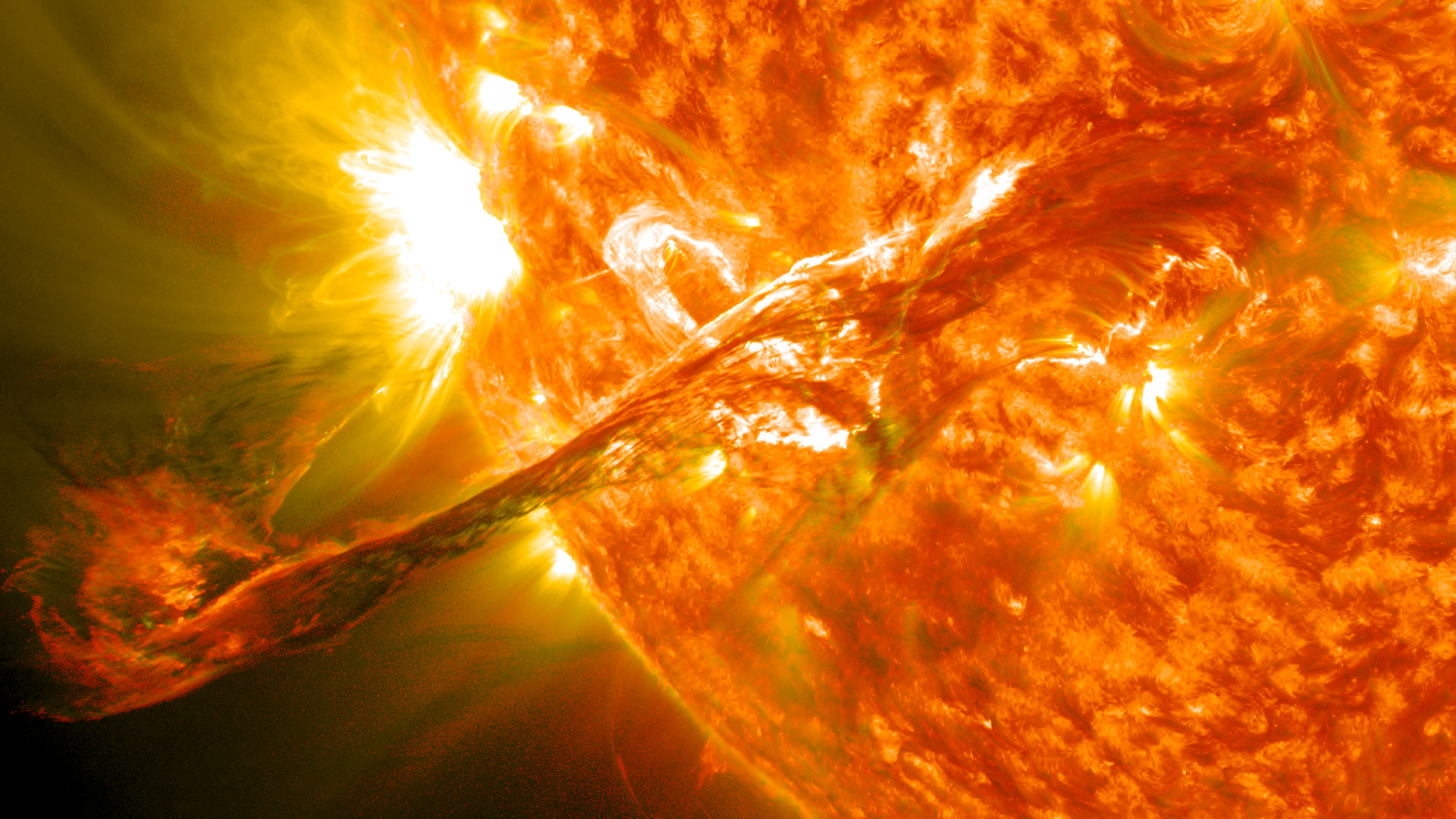
August 31, 2012 CME: pictured here is a lighten blended version of the 304 and 171 angstrom wavelengths.

==== August ====
On August 31, 2012, a long filament of solar material that had been hovering in the Sun's atmosphere (the corona) erupted out into space at 4:36 p.m. EDT. The CME traveled at over 1500 km (900 miles) per second. The CME did not travel directly toward Earth, but did connect with Earth's magnetic environment, or magnetosphere, with a glancing blow. causing aurorae to appear on the night of Monday, September 3. A G2 (moderate) geomagnetic storm was registered on September 3 and September 5. The Sun erupted 10 M-class flares this month, the largest being an M5.5 burst ejected on August 18.

==== September ====
A filament eruption occurred during the late hours of September 27, resulting in a brief S1 (minor) radiation storm, alerted by NOAA in the early hours of the next day. The Earth-directed CME associated with this event affected Earth on September 30. A G3 geomagnetic storm was registered on October 1. The filament eruption was connected to a C3.7 flare which occurred in the vicinity of sunspot 1577. Solar activity decreased remarkably this month. 4 minor solar flares, below M2, were registered in September 2012.

Video of the X1.8 class solar flare on Oct. 23, 2012,kel as captured by NASA's Solar Dynamics Observatory (SDO) in the 131 and 304 Angstrom wavelengths. The 131 wavelength of light is used for observing solar material heated to 10 million kelvin, as in a solar flare. The wavelength is typically colorized in teal, as it is here.

==== October ====
On October 8 and 9, the arrival of a CME unrelated to solar flares and emitted on October 5 caused disturbances in the horizontal component of the Earth's magnetic field. The planetary Kp-index reached level 6, so a G2 (moderate) geomagnetic storm was reported. The Sun released an M9.0 flare on October 20. This was followed three days later on October 23 by a very impulsive flare, peaking as an X1.8-class event at 3:17 a.m. UTC. Both flares came from active region 1598, located on the left side (east) of the sun, which had previously been the source of a number of weaker flares. The M9.0 burst occurred when the sunspot was not yet rotated onto the Earth-facing side of the solar disk. The NOAA categorized the radio blackout associated with the X1.8 event as an R3. This was the 7th and last X-class flare in 2012. There was no associated Earth-directed CME.

==== November ====
14 M-class flares were registered this month, the strongest being an M6.0 flare, which erupted on November 13 by AR1613.

==== December ====
Solar activity decreased significantly this month. For first time in two years (since December 2010), no X or M-class flares were emitted by the Sun's Earth-facing side (the strongest flare was merely a C4.1). The observed sunspots were 40.8 and the 10.7 cm radio flux value was 108.4, the lowest in ten months.

2012 ended up with 129 M-class and 7 X-class solar flares.

=== 2013 ===
Solar flares in 2013
- C
- M
- X

==== April ====
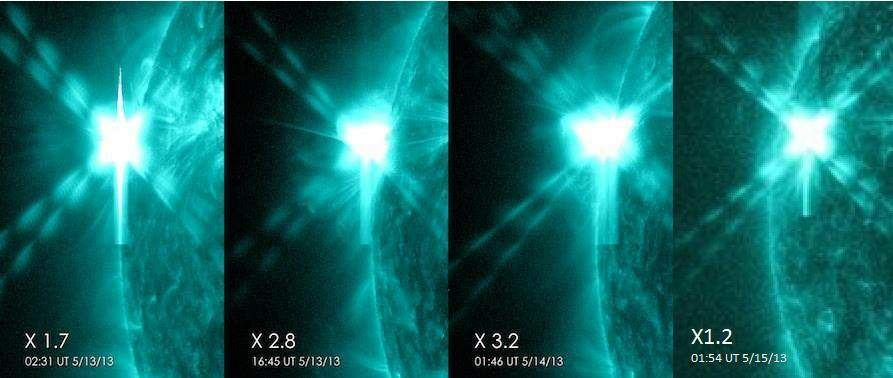
The 13–15 May 2013 series of four X-class flares erupted by AR1748: X1.7, X2.8, X3.2 and X1.2. Shots taken by NASA's Solar Dynamics Observatory (SDO) in the 131 Angstrom wavelength of extreme UV light.

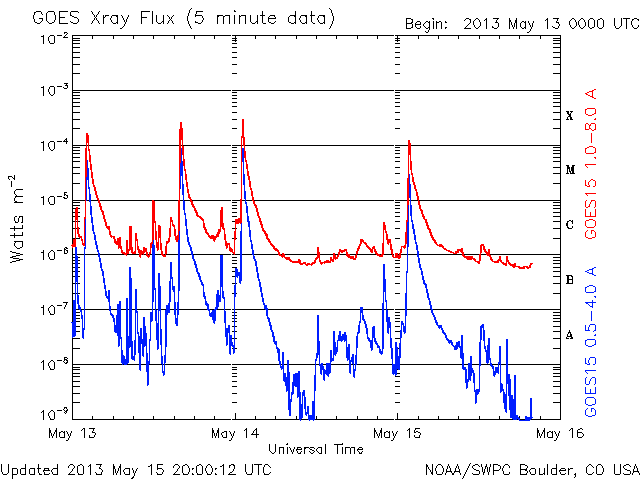
The 13–15 May 2013 series of four X-class flares as they were registered by the real-time monitor of GOES satellites X-ray Flux (NOAA/SWPC).

The unexpectedly low solar activity continued in April 2013. Only 13 M-class flares were reported from December 2012 to April 2013, the strongest being an M6.5 unleashed by active region 1719 on the 11th. This event generated an R2 radio blackout and an R2 radiation storm. The observed sunspots this month were 72.4 and the 10.7 cm radio flux value was 125.0.

==== May ====
===== String of X-class flares =====
Solar activity increased rapidly in mid-May 2013 with four consecutive strong flares in two days. These powerful bursts all surged from the just-numbered sunspot AR1748, located on the eastern limb of the Sun and barely rotating around the front of the solar disk. AR1748 emitted the first flare, an X1.7-class, on May 13, peaking at 02:17 UTC. This event was quickly followed the same day at 16:09 UTC by an X2.8-class flare. On May 14 at 01:17 UTC the same sunspot emitted an X3.2-class flare, the third strongest of the current solar cycle so far. This was followed by an X1.2-class flare at 01:52 UTC on May 15. The four X-ray bursts generated an R3 (strong) radio blackout in the upper atmosphere.

Every X-ray event was followed by a CME. The first three CMEs were not geoeffective at all as they were not directed toward Earth; the fourth CME was partially geoeffective, so a G1 (minor) geomagnetic storm was expected to occur on May 18. An S1 (minor) proton storm event was also detected in connection with the May 15 X1.2 flare.

=== 2014 ===
Solar flares in 2014
- C
- M
- X

==== February ====
On February 24, 2014, the sun erupted with an X4.9-class solar flare, the strongest of that year.

==== October ====
Four solar flares occurred within 5 days from sunspot AR 12192, which is both the largest sunspot of solar cycle 24 and the largest since 1990. On October 19 there was a major X1.1-class solar flare. On October 22 an M8.7-class flare was followed by an X1.6 event. The October 24 X3.1-class solar flare was strong enough to trigger a radio blackout. Larger than the planet Jupiter, the AR 12192 sunspot was visible during a partial solar eclipse seen in North America.

=== 2015 ===
Solar flares in 2015
- C
- M
- X

==== June ====
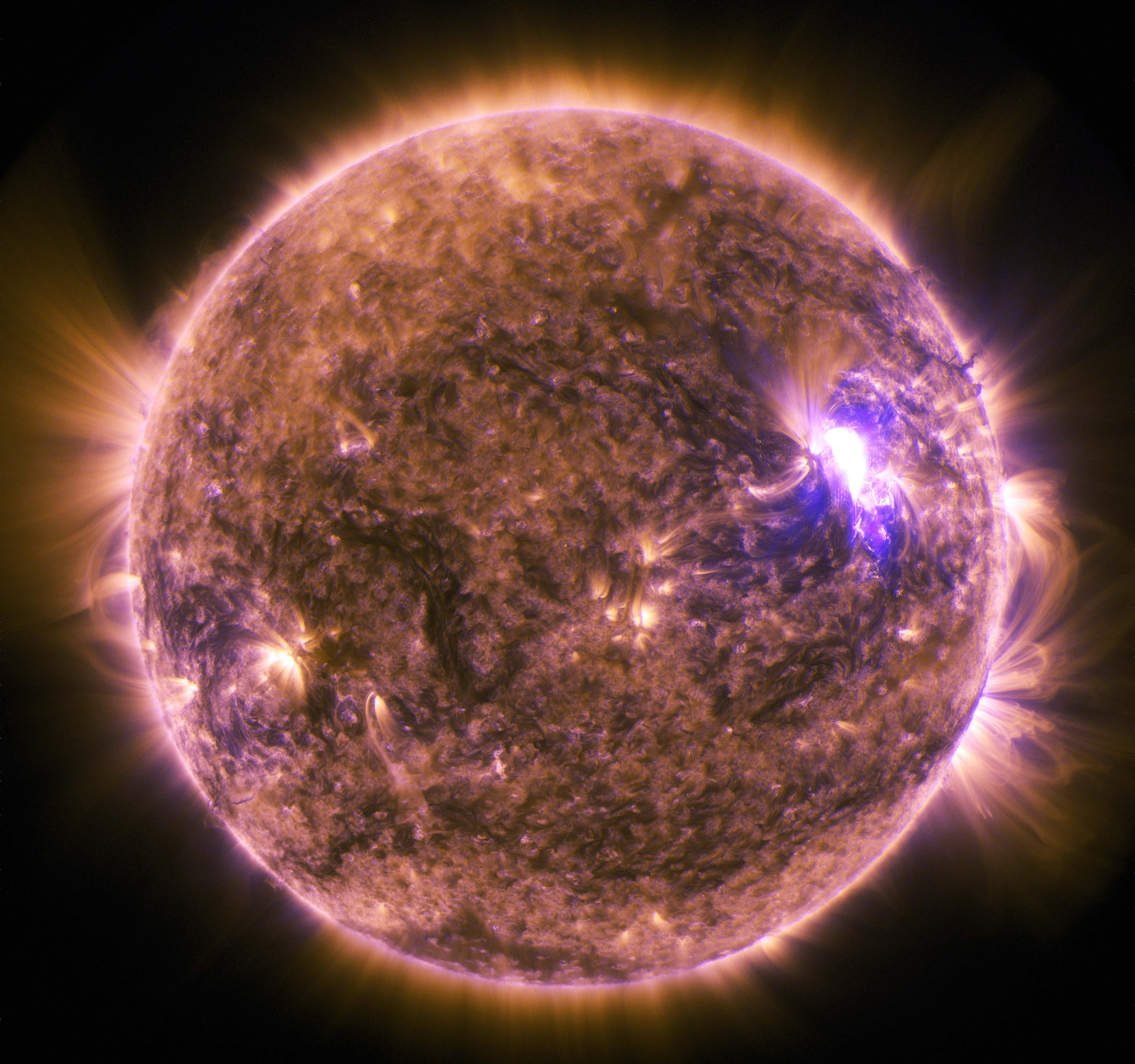
The SDO captured an image of the June 25, 2015 event.

The sun emitted a mid-level solar flare, an M7.9-class, peaking at 4:16 a.m. EDT on June 25, 2015.

==== November ====
In early November 2015, solar flares disrupted the air traffic control system in central and southern Sweden, causing heavy delays for passengers.

=== 2016 ===
Solar flares in 2016
- C
- M
- X

==== December ====
A sunspot group originally attributed to the new solar cycle 25 is observed. The sunspot numbers continue to decline.

During 2016, there were 26 days with no sunspots (preliminary numbers).

=== 2017 ===
Solar flares in 2017
- C
- M
- X

==== March ====
As of 31 March, preliminary reports indicate there had been 24 days during 2017 during which there were no sunspots.

==== September ====
On 6 September the largest X-class flare in a decade (X9.3) erupted from active region 2673. Then, when this region was just crossing the west limb, another X-class flare (SOL2017-09-10, X8.2) produced only the second ground-level particle event of the cycle. Sunspot region 2673 was one of the most active regions during the entire cycle, creating both of the largest flares in the cycle and 4 total X-class flares. No further M class flares would take place during the rest of Solar cycle 24.

=== 2018 ===
Solar flares in 2018
- C
- M
- X

==== January ====
A small active region, NOAA 12694, appeared at the surprisingly high latitude of S32, near the disk center (January 8). Its location conflicted directly with the expectation from the butterfly diagram. In principle new-cycle spots should appear at such a latitude, but this region had the correct polarity for Cycle 24.

==== March ====
NOAA reported that the number of sunspots was the lowest since 2009, and that recent activity matched that of the low activity in 2007 and 2008. Should this prove to be the solar minimum, Solar Cycle 24 would uniquely become a short (10 year) and weak cycle. Sunspots were observed on only 5 days that month.

=== 2019 ===
Solar flares in 2019
- C
- M
- X

==== May ====
A C6.8 flare took place on 9 May 2019, the strongest solar flare to take place since October 2017.

==== July ====
NASA's Solar Dynamics Observatory recorded a sunspot from Solar Cycle 25. This sunspot is significant compared to previous sunspots from Solar Cycle 25 due to the fact that it lasted long enough to get a designation.

==== October ====
The sun reached its absolute solar minimum in October 2019, marking the end of Solar cycle 24 and the beginning of Solar cycle 25.

== See also ==
- List of solar cycles
- Solar cycle
