= List of solar cycles =

Solar cycles are nearly periodic 11-year changes in the Sun's activity that are based on the number of sunspots present on the Sun's surface. The first solar cycle conventionally is said to have started in 1755. The source data are the revised International Sunspot Numbers (ISN v2.0), as available at SILSO. Sunspot counts exist since 1610 but the cycle numbering is not well defined during the Maunder minimum. It was proposed that one cycle might have been lost in the late 18th century, but this remains not fully confirmed.

Solar cycles can be reconstructed indirectly, using the radiocarbon ^{14}C proxy, for the last millennium.

The smoothing is done using the traditional SIDC smoothing algorithm. Using this algorithm, if the month in question is notated month 0, a weighted average is formed of months −6 to 6, where months −5 to 5 are given weightings of 1, and months −6 and 6 are given weightings of 0.5. Other smoothing formulas exist, and they usually give slightly different values for the amplitude and timings of the solar cycles. An example is the Meeus smoothing formula, with related solar cycles characteristics available in this STCE news item.

The start of solar cycle 25 was declared by SIDC on September 15, 2020 as being in December 2019. This makes cycle 24 the only "11-year solar cycle" to have lasted precisely 11 years.

== Details of cycles 1 to 25 ==
Solar cycle	Start (Min) (Y-M)	Min SSN (start of cycle)	Max (Y-M)	Max SSN	Ave spots per day	Time of Rise (Y-M)	Length (Y-M)
Solar cycle 1	1755 – Feb	14.0	1761 – Jun	144	(70)	6-4	11-4
Solar cycle 2	1766 – Jun	18.6	1769 – Sep	193	(99)	3-3	9-0
Solar cycle 3	1775 – Jun	12.0	1778 – May	264	(111)	2-11	9-3
Solar cycle 4	1784 – Sep	15.9	1788 – Feb	235	(103)	3-5	13-7
Solar cycle 5	1798 – Apr	5.3	1805 – Feb	82	(38)	6-10	12-3
Solar cycle 6	1810 – Jul	0.0	1816 – May	81	(31)	5-10	12-10
Solar cycle 7	1823 – May	0.1	1829 – Nov	119	(63)	6-6	10-6
Solar cycle 8	1833 – Nov	12.2	1837 – Mar	245	(112)	3-4	9-8
Solar cycle 9	1843 – Jul	17.6	1848 – Feb	220	(99)	4-7	12-5
Solar cycle 10	1855 – Dec	6.0	1860 – Feb	186	92	4-2	11-3
Solar cycle 11	1867 – Mar	9.9	1870 – Aug	234	89	3-5	11-9
Solar cycle 12	1878 – Dec	3.7	1883 – Dec	124	57	5-0	11-3
Solar cycle 13	1890 – Mar	8.3	1894 – Jan	147	65	3-10	11-10
Solar cycle 14	1902 – Jan	4.5	1906 – Feb	107	54	4-1	11-6
Solar cycle 15	1913 – Jul	2.5	1917 – Aug	176	73	4-1	10-1
Solar cycle 16	1923 – Aug	9.3	1928 – Apr	130	68	4-8	10-1
Solar cycle 17	1933 – Sep	5.8	1937 – Apr	199	96	3-7	10-5
Solar cycle 18	1944 – Feb	12.9	1947 – May	219	109	3-3	10-2
Solar cycle 19	1954 – Apr	5.1	1958 – Mar	285	129	3-11	10-6
Solar cycle 20	1964 – Oct	14.3	1968 – Nov	157	86	4-1	11-5
Solar cycle 21	1976 – Mar	17.8	1979 – Dec	233	111	3-9	10-6
Solar cycle 22	1986 – Sep	13.5	1989 – Nov	213	106	3-2	9-11
Solar cycle 23	1996 – Aug	11.2	2001 – Nov	180	82	5-3	12-4
Solar cycle 24	2008 – Dec	2.2	2014 – Apr	116	49	5-4	11-0
Solar cycle 25	2019 – Dec	1.8	2024 – Oct	161	Progr: SC25 (86); SC24 (67)	4–10	

- The maximum SSN of 160.9 for October 2024 is 73% above the maximum SSN predicted by Zharkova for SC25.

== Unofficial cycles starting with a maximum ==
The following table is instead divided into (unofficial) cycles starting and ending with a maximum, for the purpose of indicating the number of spotless days associated with each minimum. It begins with cycle 10-11 due to the significant amount of missing daily data before this time, which allows estimated averages to be calculated, but does not permit totals to be counted.

Solar Cycles	Start (Maximum)	Spotless days
Solar cycle 10–11	1860 – Feb	406
Solar cycle 11–12	1870 – Aug	1028
Solar cycle 12–13	1883 – Dec	736
Solar cycle 13–14	1894 – Jan	934
Solar cycle 14–15	1906 – Feb	1023
Solar cycle 15–16	1917 – Aug	534
Solar cycle 16–17	1928 – Apr	568
Solar cycle 17–18	1937 – Apr	269
Solar cycle 18–19	1947 – May	446
Solar cycle 19–20	1958 – Mar	227
Solar cycle 20–21	1968 – Nov	272
Solar cycle 21–22	1979 – Dec	273
Solar cycle 22–23	1989 – Oct	309
Solar cycle 23–24	2001 – Nov	817
Solar cycle 24–25	2014 – Apr	849
Solar cycle 25–26	2024 – Oct	0
