= Solar cycle 19 =

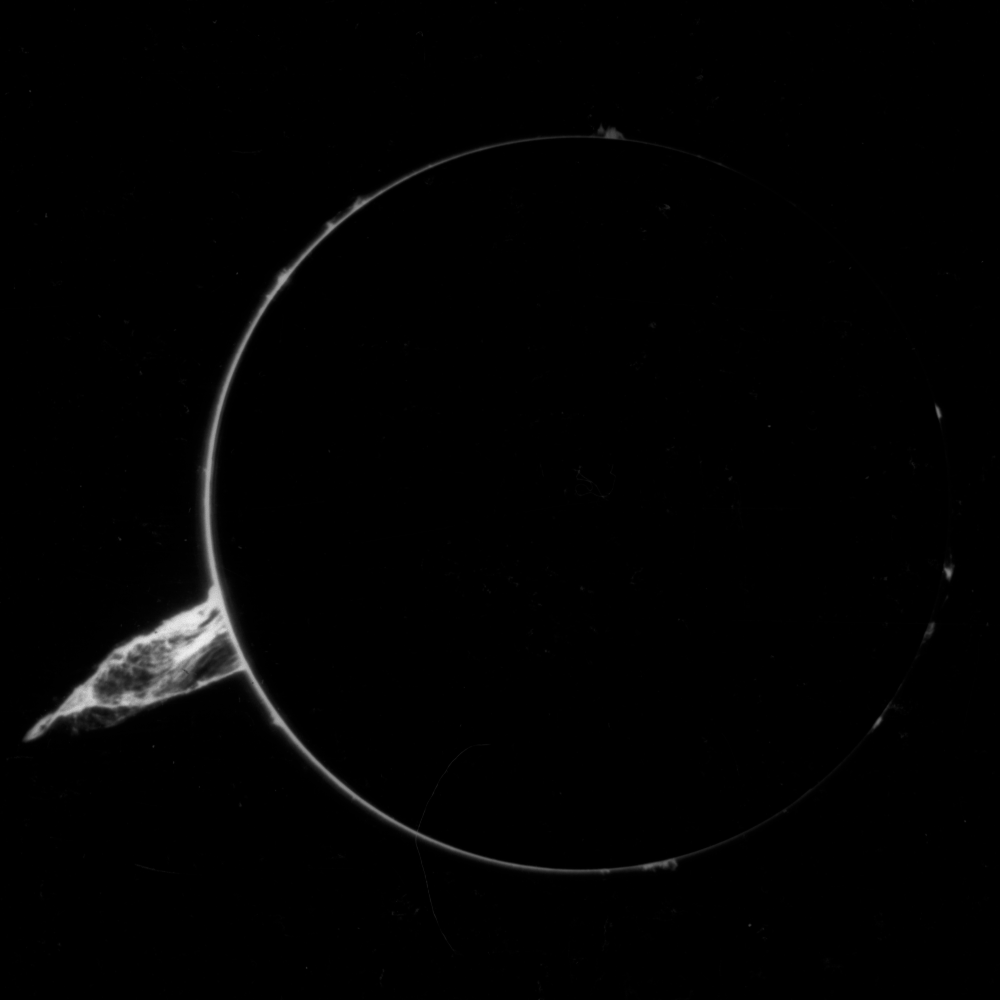
- A solar prominence during solar cycle 19 (11 April 1959).

Sunspot data
- Start date: April 1954
- End date: October 1964
- Duration (years): 10.5
- Max count: 285.0
- Max count month: March 1958
- Min count: 5.1
- Spotless days: 227

Cycle chronology
- Previous cycle: Solar cycle 18 (1944–1954)
- Next cycle: Solar cycle 20 (1964–1976)

Solar cycle 19 was the nineteenth solar cycle since 1755, when extensive recording of solar sunspot activity began. The solar cycle lasted 10.5 years, beginning in April 1954 and ending in October 1964. The International Geophysical Year occurred at the peak of this solar cycle.

The maximum smoothed sunspot number observed during the solar cycle was 285.0, in March 1958 (the highest on record), and the starting minimum was 5.1.

During the minimum transit from solar cycle 19 to 20, there were a total of 227 days with no sunspots. This was the lowest number since 1850.

== Extreme events ==
A geomagnetic storm in February 1956 interfered with radio communications and prompted a search for the British submarine Acheron after it lost radio contact.

Intense red aurora displays frightened people in Europe on 11 February 1958 and were visible from many US cities as far south as the 40th parallel. This geomagnetic storm caused a radio blackout over North America.

Aurora displays were visible over New York on 13 November 1960 and 1 October 1961.

== See also ==
- List of solar cycles
