= Solar cycle 20 =

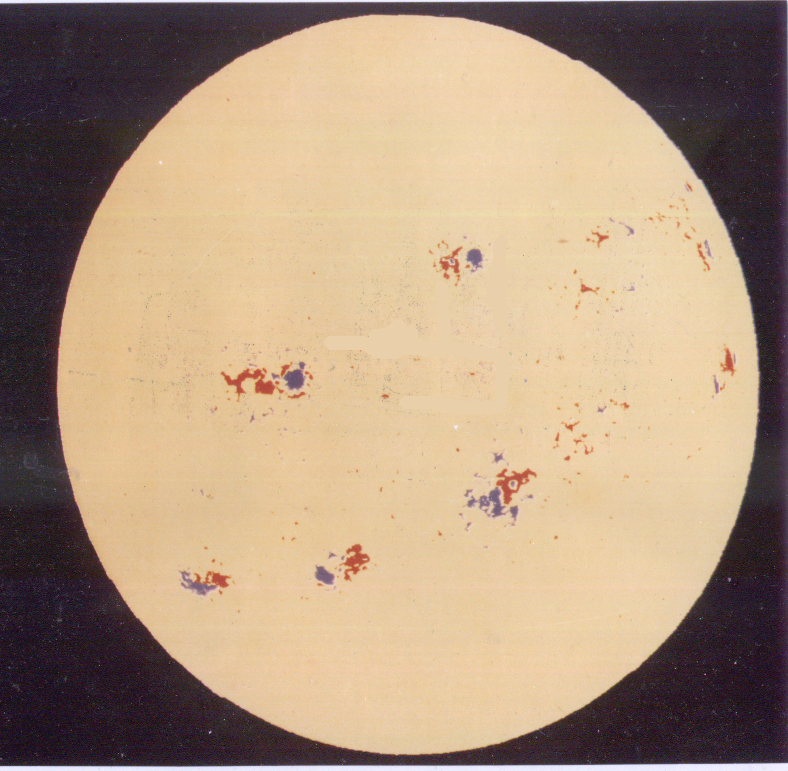
- Solar magnetogram from solar cycle 20 (1974).

Sunspot data
- Start date: October 1964
- End date: March 1976
- Duration (years): 11.4
- Max count: 156.6
- Max count month: November 1968
- Min count: 14.3
- Spotless days: 272

Cycle chronology
- Previous cycle: Solar cycle 19 (1954–1964)
- Next cycle: Solar cycle 21 (1976–1986)

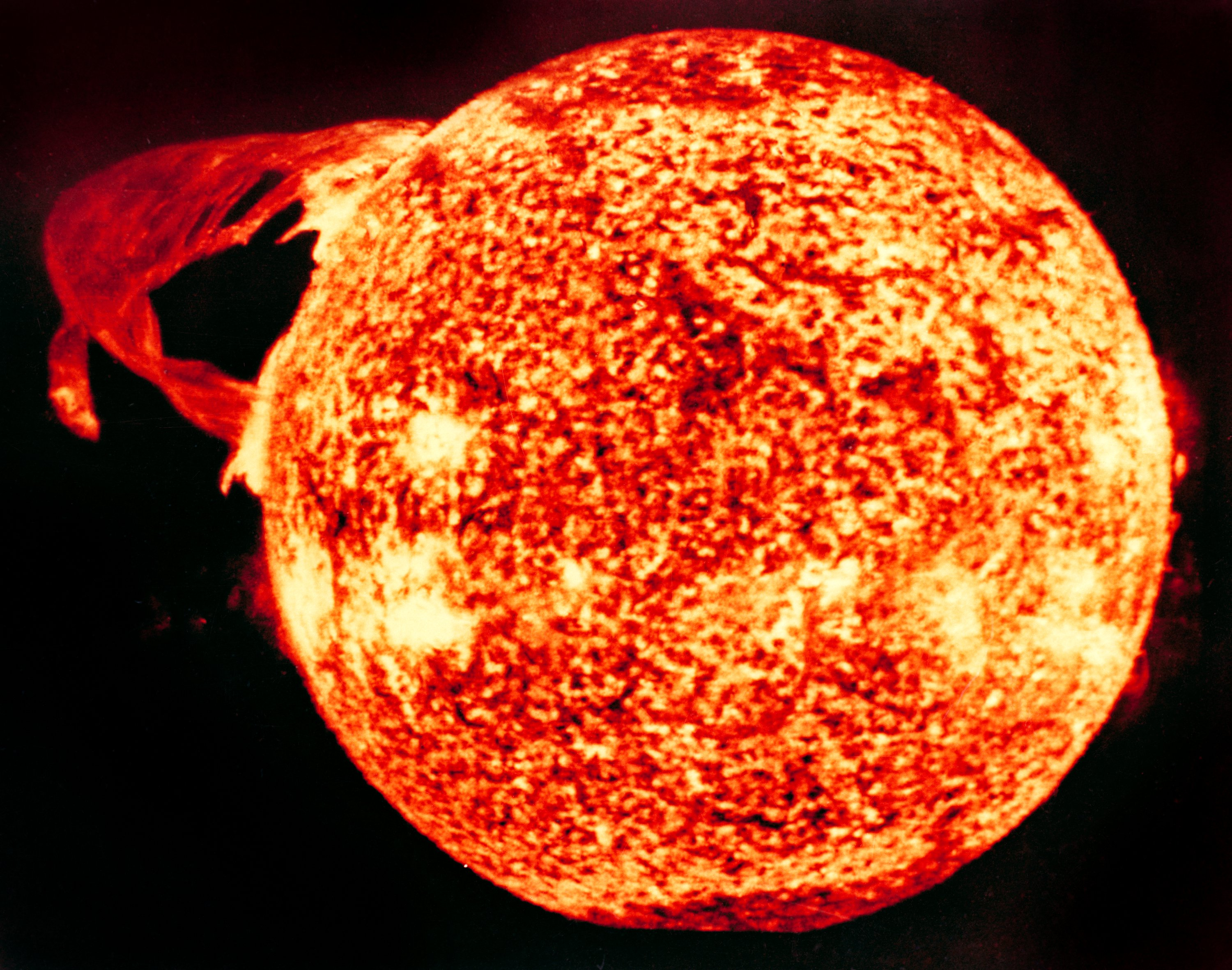
One of the largest solar prominences ever recorded, from solar cycle 20 (19 December 1973).

Solar cycle 20 was the twentieth solar cycle since 1755, when extensive recording of solar sunspot activity began. The solar cycle lasted 11.4 years, beginning in October 1964 and ending in March 1976. The maximum smoothed sunspot number observed during the solar cycle was 156.6 (November 1968), and the starting minimum was 14.3. During the minimum transit from solar cycle 20 to 21, there were a total of 272 days with no sunspots.

Comparison with other cycles shows that geomagnetic activity during the declining phase of cycle 20 (1973–1975) was unusually high. Heavy solar activity was a factor in causing the earlier-than-expected atmospheric reentry of Skylab in 1979.

Data from solar cycle 20 was used to build the K-1974 solar proton fluence model, used for planning space missions during solar cycle 21.

== August 1972 solar storm ==
An extremely active active region, McMath 11976, produced a historic series of solar flares and coronal mass ejections (CMEs) in August 1972. One CME traveled to Earth in a record low of 14.6 hours and produced a strong geomagnetic storm that caused widespread electrical and communications grid disturbances and the accidental detonation of numerous U.S. Navy magnetic sea mines in North Vietnam.

== See also ==
- List of solar cycles
