= Solar cycle 10 =

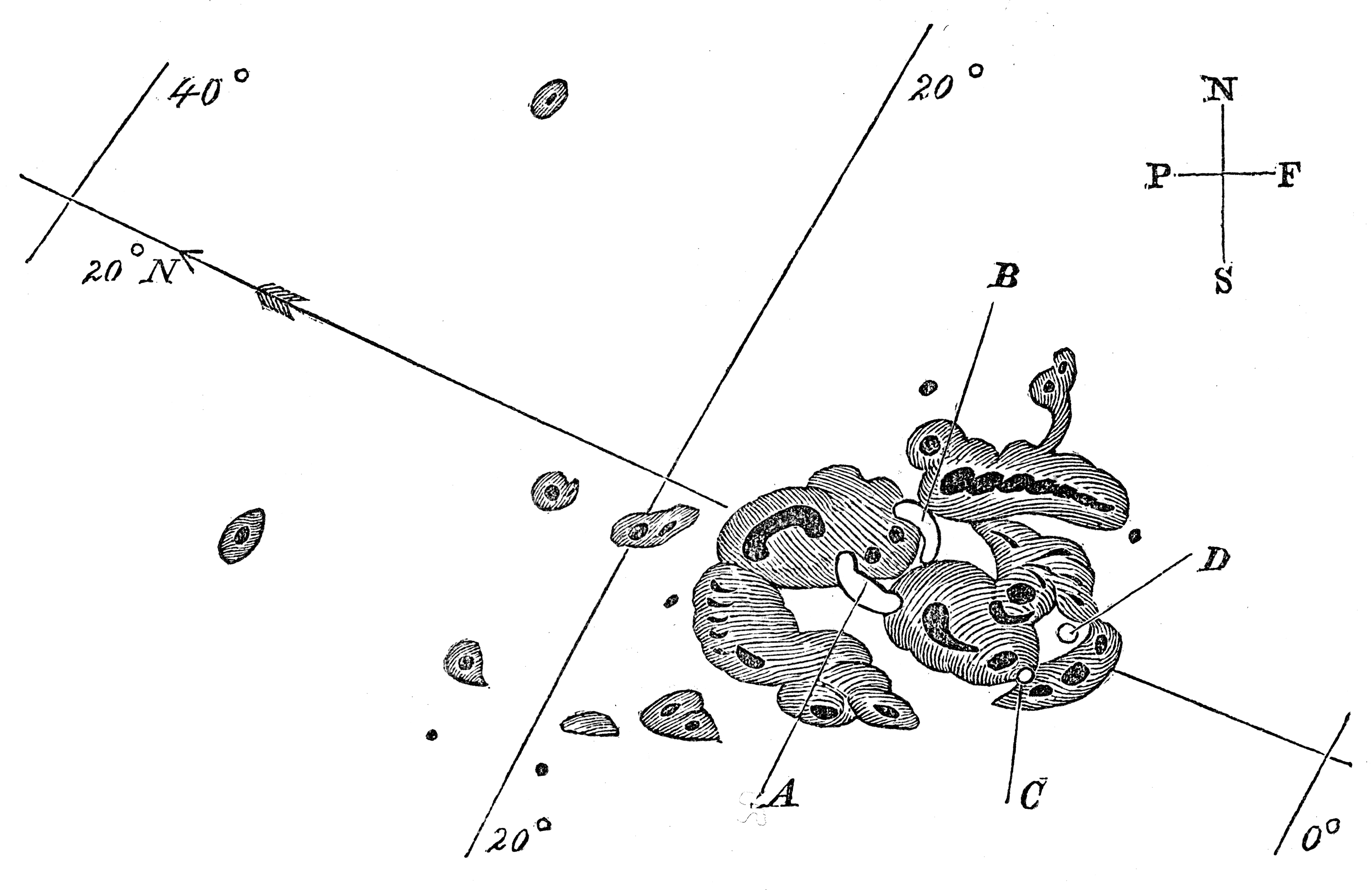
- Sunspots during solar cycle 10, as sketched by Richard Carrington (September 1, 1859).

Sunspot data
- Start date: December 1855
- End date: March 1867
- Duration (years): 11.3
- Max count: 186.2
- Max count month: February 1860
- Min count: 6.0
- Spotless days: 406

Cycle chronology
- Previous cycle: Solar cycle 9 (1843-1855)
- Next cycle: Solar cycle 11 (1867-1878)

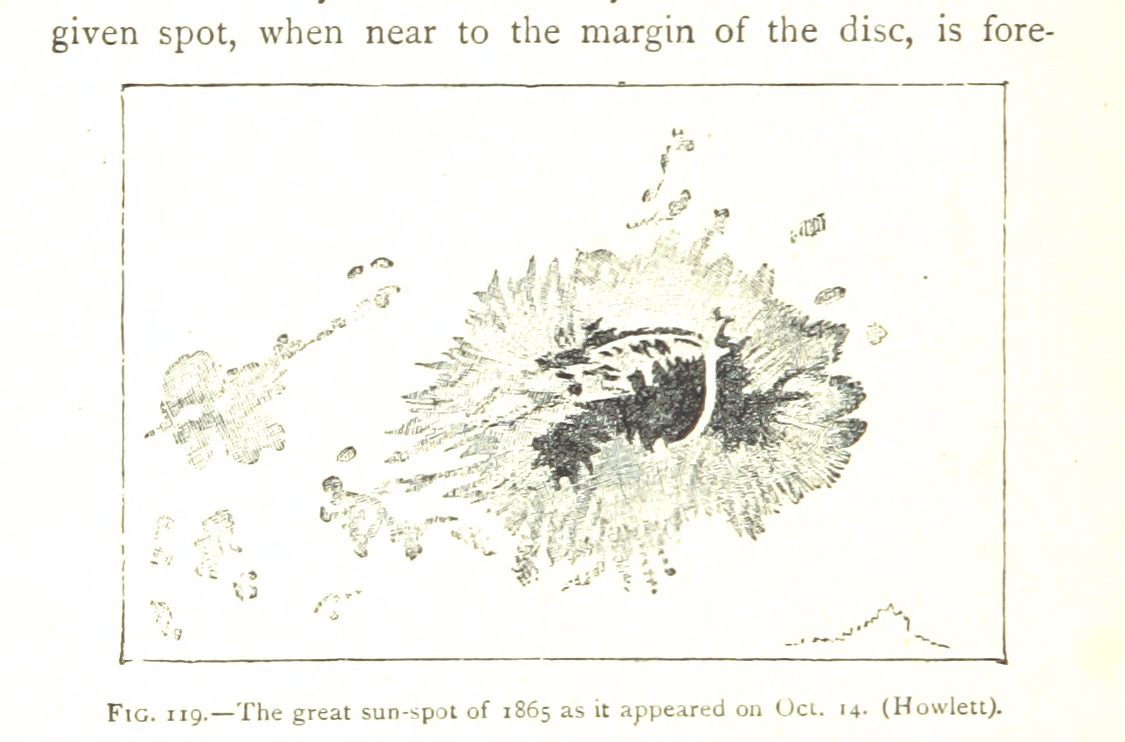
Drawing of the Great Sunspot of 1865

Solar cycle 10 was the tenth solar cycle since 1755, when extensive recording of solar sunspot activity began. The solar cycle lasted 11.3 years, beginning in December 1855 and ending in March 1867. The maximum smoothed sunspot number observed during the solar cycle was 186.2 (February 1860), and the starting minimum was 6.0. During the transit from solar cycle 10 to 11, there were a total of 406 days without sunspots.

The first observations of solar flares occurred during this cycle.

== Solar storm of 1859 ==
On September 1, 1859, the first solar flare was observed independently by Richard Carrington and Richard Hodgson.

On September 1–2, 1859, the largest recorded geomagnetic storm occurred in what would be known as the Carrington Event. Aurorae were seen around the world, even over the Caribbean; those over the Rocky Mountains were so bright that their glow awoke gold miners, who began preparing breakfast because they thought it was morning. Telegraph systems all over Europe and North America failed. Telegraph pylons threw sparks and telegraph paper spontaneously caught fire. Some telegraph systems continued to send and receive messages despite having been disconnected from their power supplies.

== See also ==
- Solar variation
- List of solar cycles
