= Solar cycle 21 =

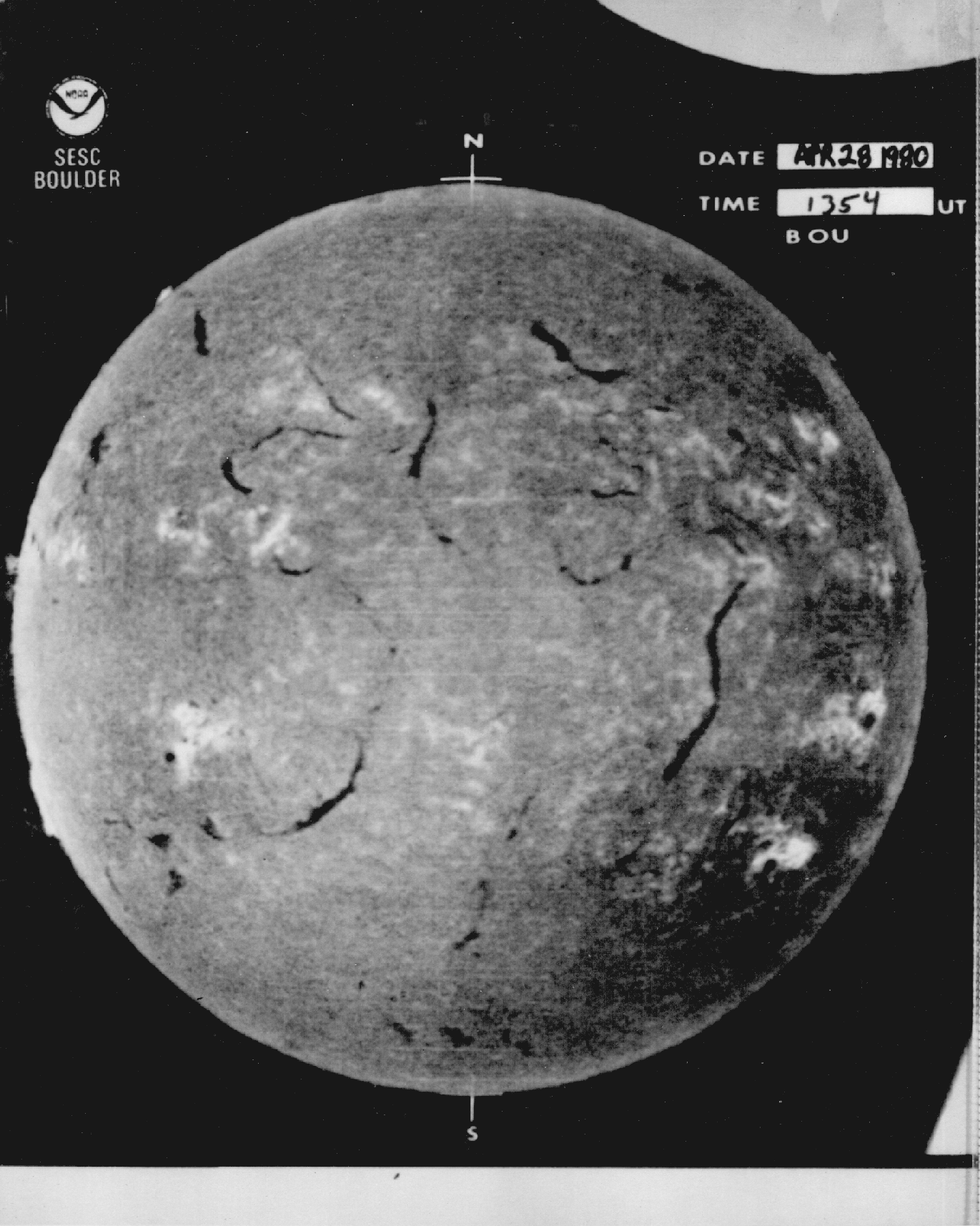
- The Sun, recorded at the H-alpha wavelength, during solar cycle 21 (28 April 1980).

Sunspot data
- Start date: March 1976
- End date: September 1986
- Duration (years): 10.5
- Max count: 232.9
- Max count month: December 1979
- Min count: 17.8
- Spotless days: 273

Cycle chronology
- Previous cycle: Solar cycle 20 (1964-1976)
- Next cycle: Solar cycle 22 (1986-1996)

Solar cycle 21 was the 21st solar cycle since 1755, when extensive recording of solar sunspot activity began. The solar cycle lasted 10.5 years, beginning in March 1976 and ending in September 1986. The maximum smoothed sunspot number observed during the solar cycle was 232.9, in December 1979, and the starting minimum was 17.8. During the minimum transit from solar cycle 21 to 22, there were a total of 273 days with no sunspots. The largest solar flare of this cycle (X15) occurred on July 11, 1978.

This solar cycle marked the beginning of systematic monitoring of the total solar irradiance from space.

== See also ==
- Solar variation
- List of solar cycles
