= Solar cycle 11 =

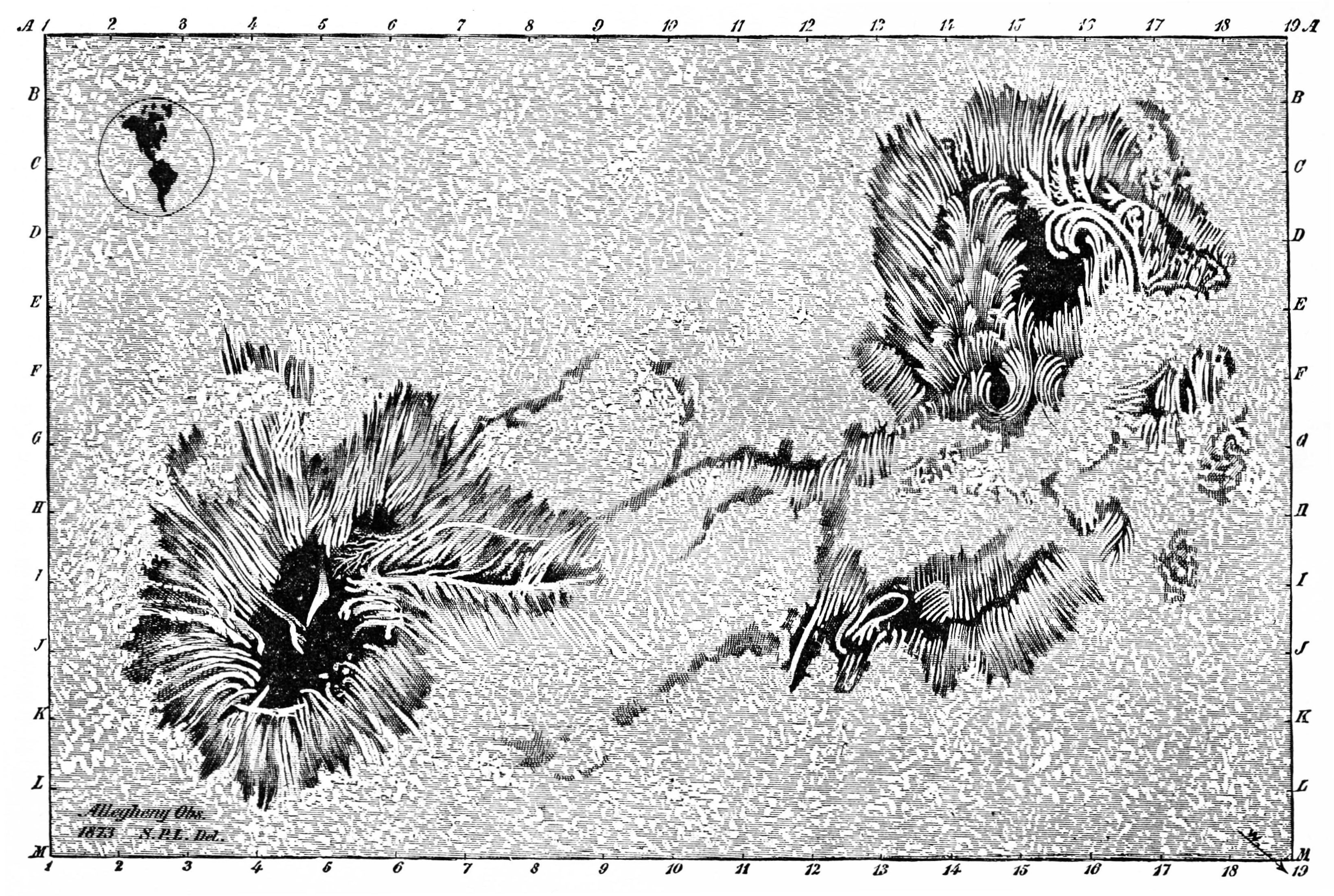
- Sunspots observed during solar cycle 11 (1873)

Sunspot data
- Start date: March 1867
- End date: December 1878
- Duration (years): 11.8
- Max count: 234.0
- Max count month: August 1870
- Min count: 9.9
- Spotless days: 1028

Cycle chronology
- Previous cycle: Solar cycle 10 (1855–1867)
- Next cycle: Solar cycle 12 (1878–1890)

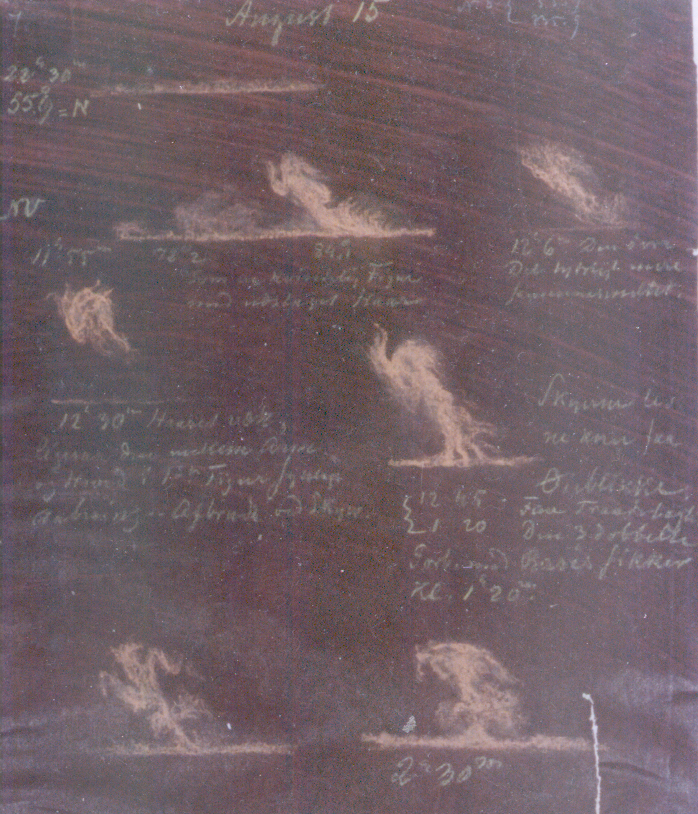
Solar prominences observed by Carl Frederik Fearnley during solar cycle 11 (1872–1873).

Solar cycle 11 was the eleventh solar cycle since 1755, when extensive recording of solar sunspot activity began. The solar cycle lasted 11.8 years, beginning in March 1867 and ending in December 1878. The maximum smoothed sunspot number observed during the solar cycle was 234.0 (August 1870), and the starting minimum was 9.9. During the minimum transit from solar cycle 11 to 12, there were a total of 1028 days with no sunspots (the highest recorded of any cycle transit to date).

Strong auroral displays were observed in October 1870, February 1872, and August 1872.

== See also ==
- List of solar cycles
