= Solar cycle 18 =

Sunspot data
- Start date: February 1944
- End date: April 1954
- Duration (years): 10.2
- Max count: 218.7
- Max count month: May 1947
- Min count: 12.9
- Spotless days: 446

Cycle chronology
- Previous cycle: Solar cycle 17 (1933–1944)
- Next cycle: Solar cycle 19 (1954–1964)

Solar cycle 18 was the eighteenth solar cycle since 1755, when extensive recording of solar sunspot activity began. The solar cycle lasted 10.2 years, beginning in February 1944 and ending in April 1954. The maximum smoothed sunspot number observed during the solar cycle was 218.7 (May 1947), and the starting minimum was 12.9. During the minimum transit from solar cycle 18 to 19, there were a total of 446 days with no sunspots.

Cycle 18 was characterized by "giant" sunspots. The recording of the 10.7 cm (2800 MHz) solar radio flux began partway during this cycle, and values of the solar flux during this cycle turned out to be particularly high.

== See also ==
- List of solar cycles
