= Solar cycle 17 =

Sunspot data
- Start date: September 1933
- End date: February 1944
- Duration (years): 10.4
- Max count: 198.6
- Max count month: April 1937
- Min count: 5.8
- Spotless days: 269

Cycle chronology
- Previous cycle: Solar cycle 16 (1923–1933)
- Next cycle: Solar cycle 18 (1944–1954)

Solar cycle 17 was the seventeenth solar cycle since 1755, when extensive recording of solar sunspot activity began. The solar cycle lasted 10.4 years, beginning in September 1933 and ending in February 1944. The maximum smoothed sunspot number observed during the solar cycle was 198.6 (April 1937), and the starting minimum was 5.8. During the minimum transit from solar cycle 17 to 18, there were a total of 269 days with no sunspots.

== History ==
=== 1938 ===
A great aurora display was seen all over Europe on 25 January 1938, as far south as Portugal and Sicily, frightening many people. Some thought that the red glow indicated large fires, while others linked it to the Fátima prophecies. An aurora was visible over New York on 3 April 1940.

== See also ==
- List of solar cycles
