= Solar cycle 16 =

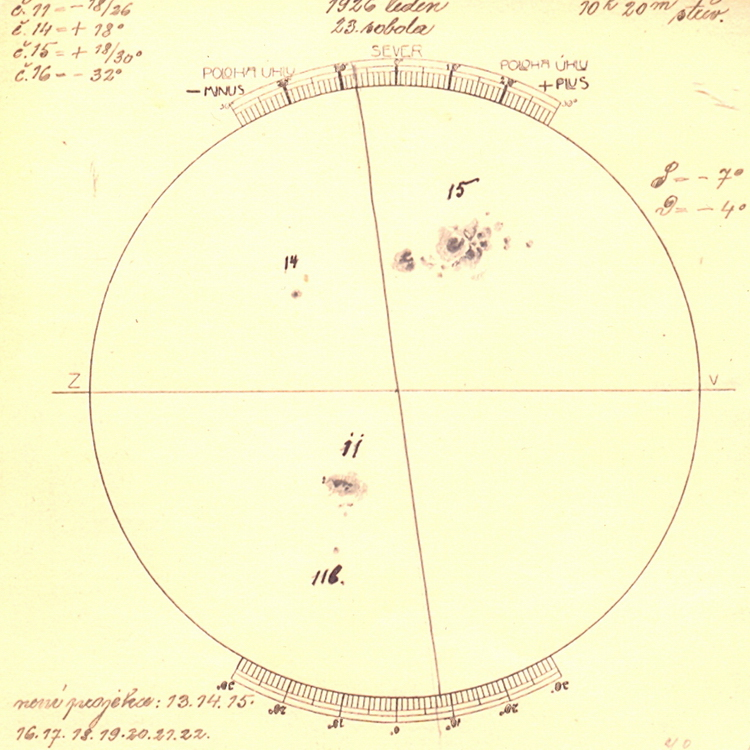
- Sunspot record from 23 January 1923

Sunspot data
- Start date: August 1923
- End date: September 1933
- Duration (years): 10.1
- Max count: 130.2
- Max count month: April 1928
- Min count: 9.4
- Spotless days: 568

Cycle chronology
- Previous cycle: Solar cycle 15 (1913–1923)
- Next cycle: Solar cycle 17 (1933–1944)

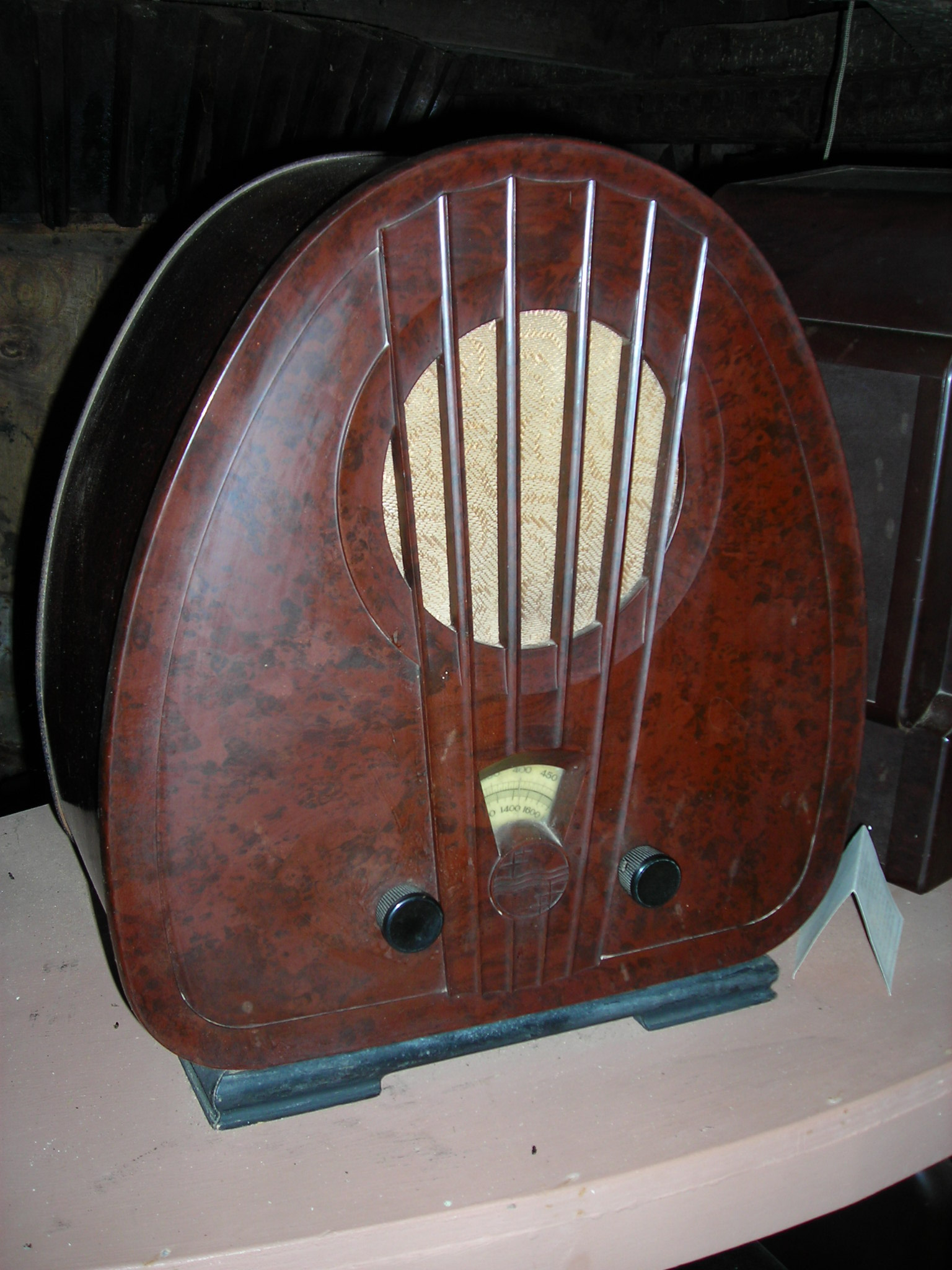
Radio transmission became common during solar cycle 16, making this the first solar cycle in which radio interference became an issue.

Solar cycle 16 was the sixteenth solar cycle since 1755, when extensive recording of solar sunspot activity began. The solar cycle lasted 10.1 years, beginning in August 1923 and ending in September 1933. The maximum smoothed sunspot number observed during the solar cycle was 130.2 (April 1928), and the starting minimum was 9.4. During the minimum transit from solar cycle 16 to 17, there were a total of 568 days with no sunspots.

Newspaper reports during this period note effects on telegraph systems, but also (in March 1924, January 1926, October 1926, and October 1927) on radio transmission.

== See also ==
- List of solar cycles
