= Solar cycle 14 =

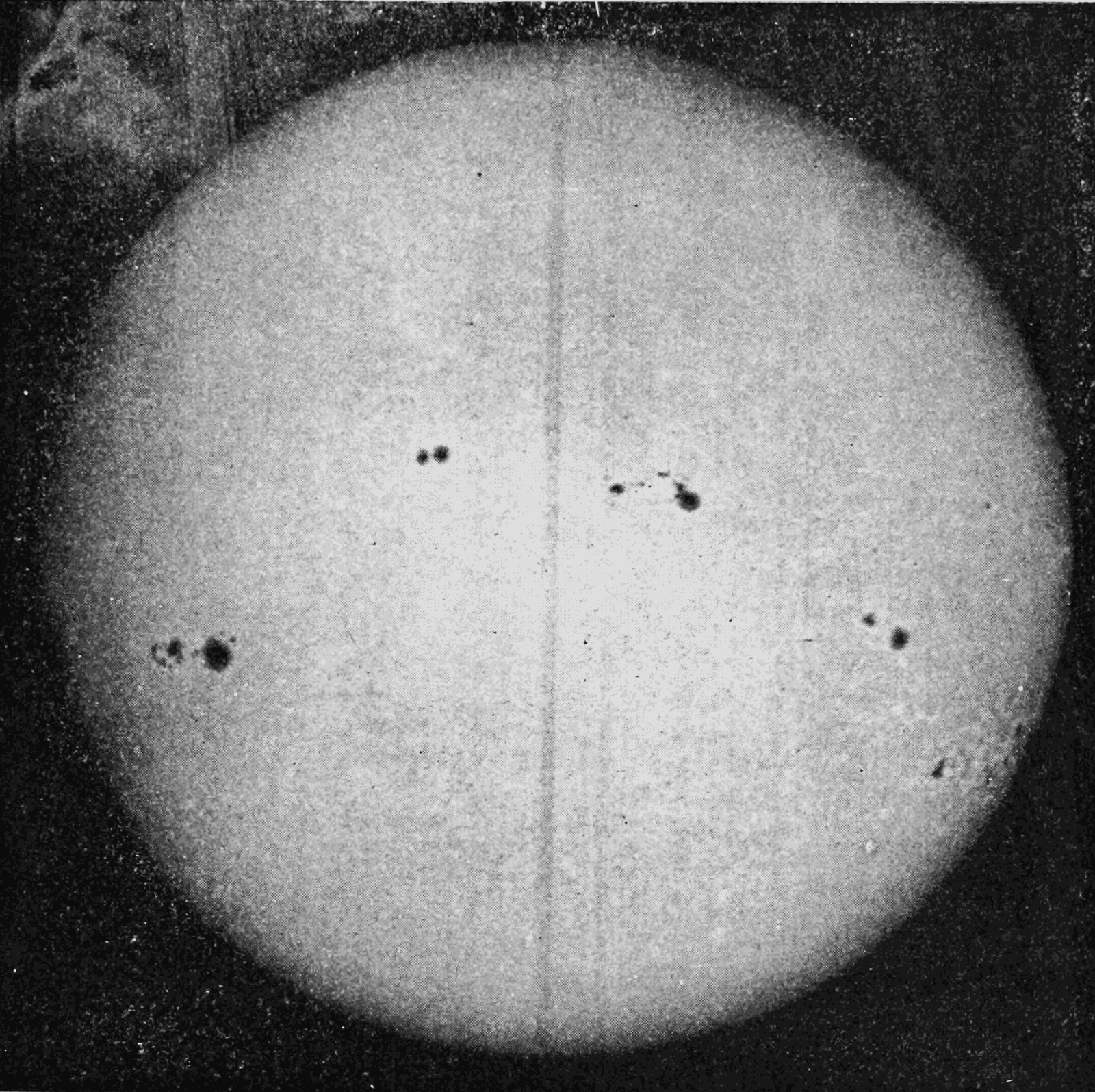
- The Sun, with some sunspots visible, during solar cycle 14 (1904).

Sunspot data
- Start date: January 1902
- End date: July 1913
- Duration (years): 11.5
- Max count: 107.1
- Max count month: February 1906
- Min count: 4.5
- Spotless days: 1023

Cycle chronology
- Previous cycle: Solar cycle 13 (1890–1902)
- Next cycle: Solar cycle 15 (1913–1923)

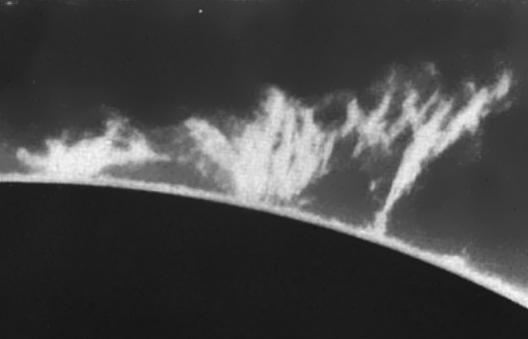
Solar prominences during solar cycle 14 (21 August 1909).

Solar cycle 14 was the fourteenth solar cycle since 1755, when extensive recording of solar sunspot activity began. The solar cycle lasted 11.5 years, beginning in January 1902 and ending in July 1913. The maximum smoothed sunspot number observed during the solar cycle was 107.1, in February 1906 (the lowest since the Dalton Minimum), and the starting minimum was 4.5. During the minimum transit from solar cycle 14 to 15, there were a total of 1023 days with no sunspots (the second highest recorded of any cycle to date).

Geomagnetic storms in November 1903, March 1905, and September 1909 affected telegraph lines.

== See also ==
- List of solar cycles
