= Solar cycle 13 =

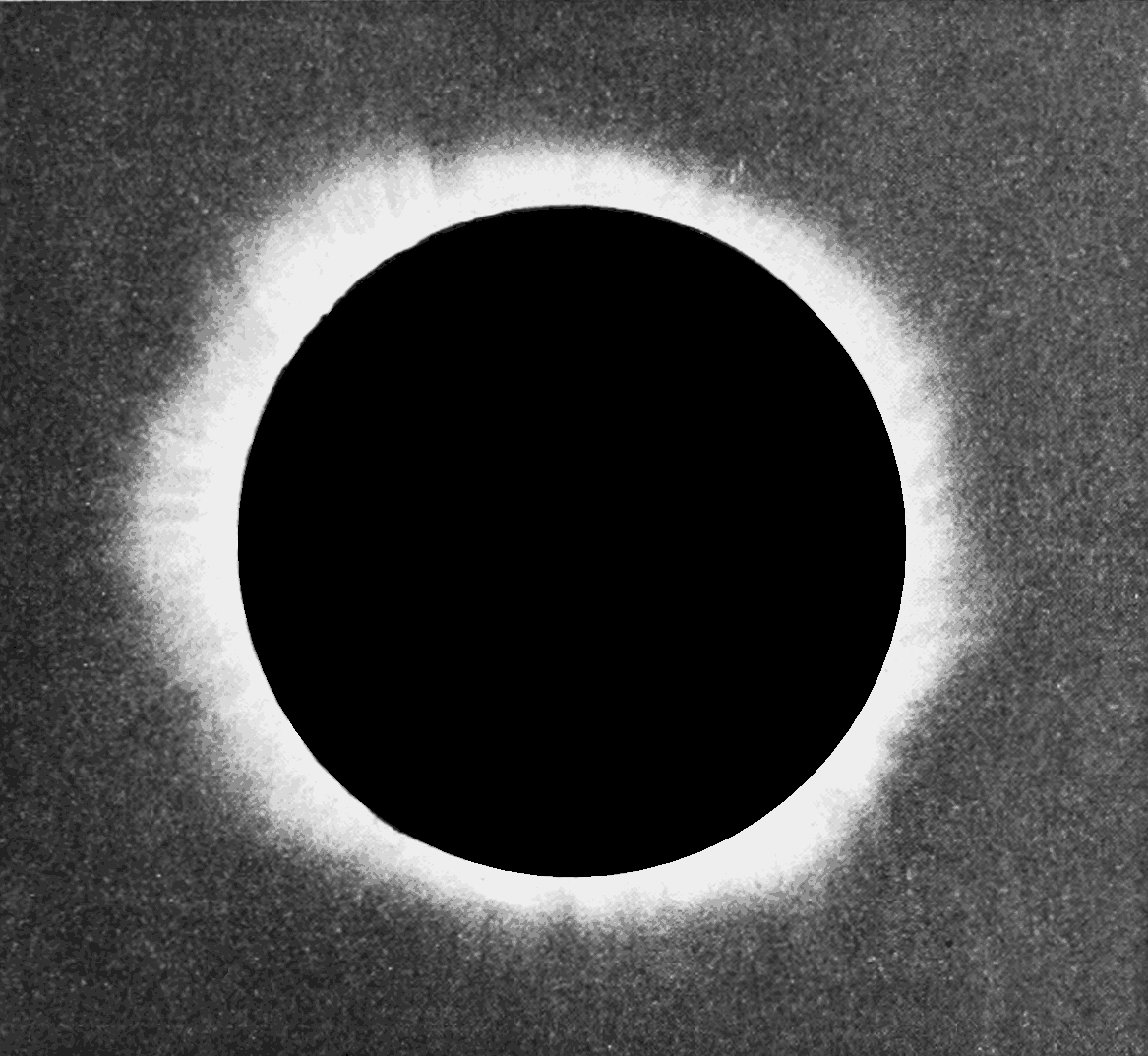
- The solar corona during an eclipse in solar cycle 13 (1893).

Sunspot data
- Start date: March 1890
- End date: January 1902
- Duration (years): 11.8
- Max count: 146.5
- Max count month: January 1894
- Min count: 8.3
- Spotless days: 934

Cycle chronology
- Previous cycle: Solar cycle 12 (1878–1890)
- Next cycle: Solar cycle 14 (1902–1913)

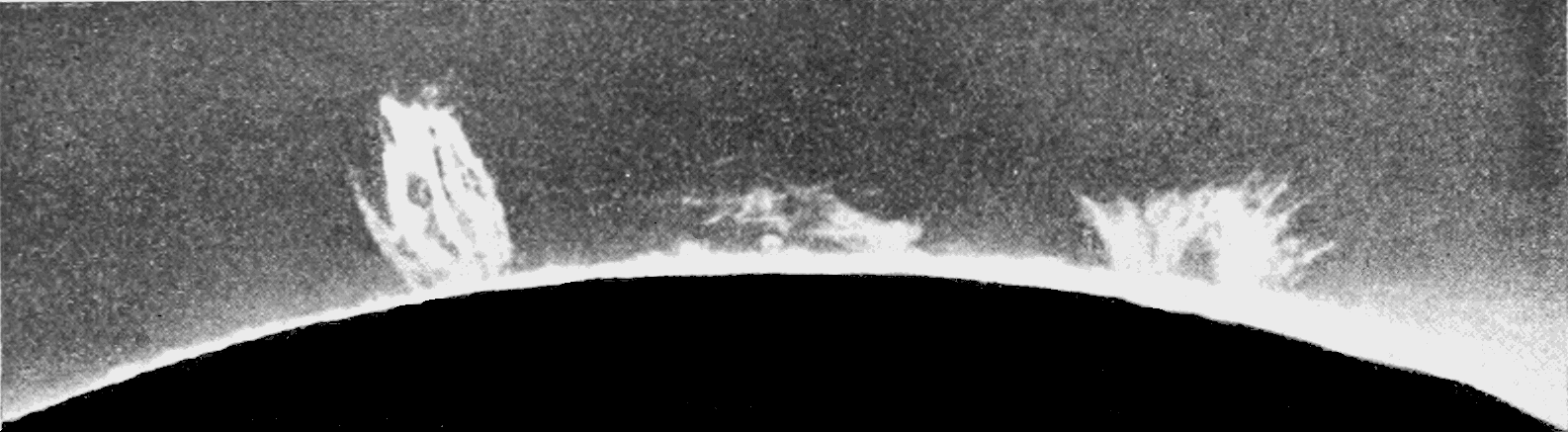
Solar prominences during an eclipse in solar cycle 13 (28 May 1900).

Solar cycle 13 was the thirteenth solar cycle since 1755, when extensive recording of solar sunspot activity began. The solar cycle lasted 11.8 years, beginning in March 1890 and ending in January 1902. The maximum smoothed sunspot number observed during the solar cycle was 146.5 (January 1894), and the starting minimum was 8.3. During the minimum transit from solar cycle 13 to 14, there were a total of 934 days with no sunspots.

There were a number of intense solar proton events during solar cycle 13, as well as geomagnetic storms such as in September 1898 which affected telegraph lines.

== See also ==
- List of solar cycles
