= Solar cycle 22 =

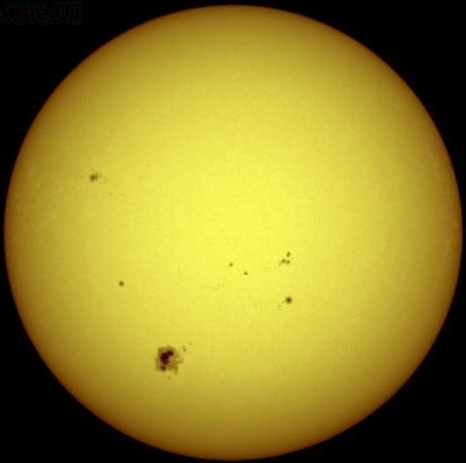
- The Sun, with some sunspots visible, during solar cycle 22 (1992).

Sunspot data
- Start date: September 1986
- End date: August 1996
- Duration (years): 9.9
- Max count: 212.5
- Max count month: November 1989
- Min count: 13.5
- Spotless days: 309

Cycle chronology
- Previous cycle: Solar cycle 21 (1976-1986)
- Next cycle: Solar cycle 23 (1996-2008)

Solar cycle 22 was the 22nd solar cycle since 1755, when extensive recording of solar sunspot activity began. The solar cycle lasted 9.9 years, beginning in September 1986 and ending in August 1996. The maximum smoothed sunspot number observed during the solar cycle was 212.5 (November 1989), and the starting minimum was 13.5. During the minimum transit from solar cycle 22 to 23, there were a total of 309 days with no sunspots.

== March 1989 geomagnetic storm ==
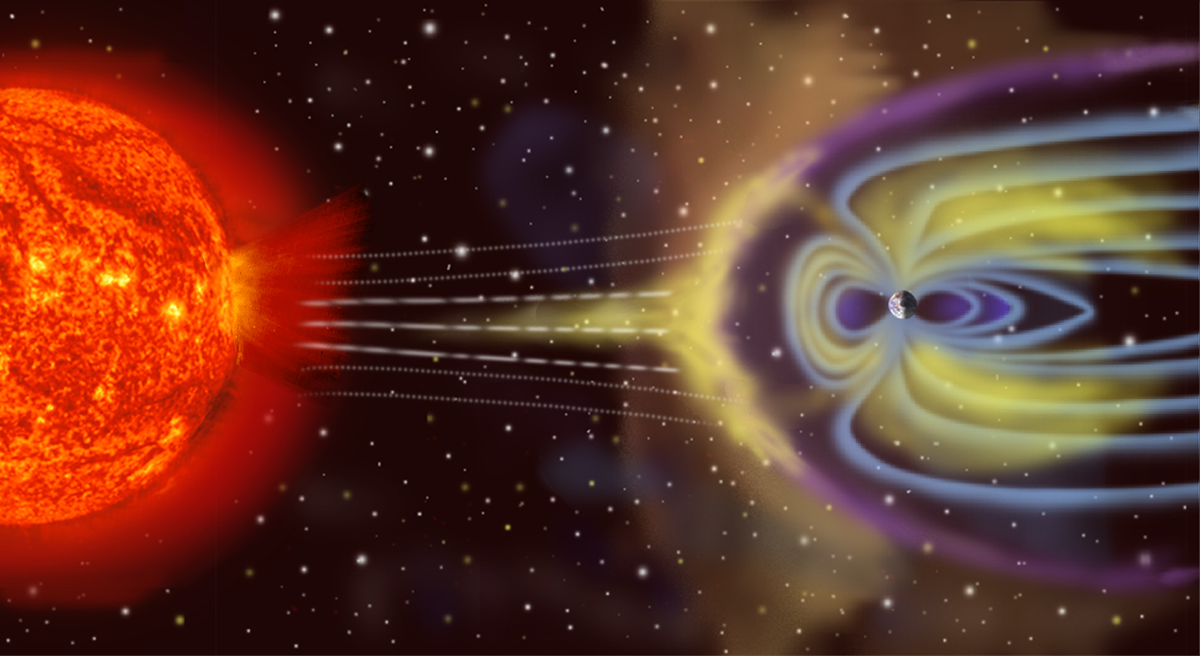
Artist's depiction of solar wind colliding with Earth's magnetosphere.

During March 1989, a severe geomagnetic storm caused the collapse of Hydro-Québec's electricity transmission system. The geomagnetic storm causing this event was itself the result of a Coronal Mass Ejection on March 9, 1989. A few days before, on March 6, 1989, a very large X15 solar flare also occurred. At 2:44 am on March 13, 1989, a severe geomagnetic storm struck Earth. The storm began on Earth with extremely intense auroras at the poles. The aurora could be seen as far south as Texas. As this occurred during the Cold War, many worried that a nuclear first-strike might be in progress. Others considered the intense auroras to be associated with the Space Shuttle mission STS-29, which had been launched on March 13 at 9:57:00 AM. The burst caused short-wave radio interference, including the disruption of radio signals from Radio Free Europe into Russia. It was initially believed that the signals had been jammed by the Soviet government.

As midnight came and went, invisible electromagnetic forces were staging their own pitched battle in a vast arena bounded by the sky above and the rocky subterranean reaches of the Earth. A river of charged particles and electrons in the ionosphere flowed from west to east, inducing powerful electrical currents in the ground that surged into many natural nooks and crannies.

Some satellites in polar orbits lost control for several hours. GOES weather satellite communications were interrupted causing weather images to be lost. NASA's TDRS-1 communication satellite recorded over 250 anomalies caused by the increased particles flowing into its sensitive electronics. The Space Shuttle Discovery was having its own mysterious problems. A sensor on one of the tanks supplying hydrogen to a fuel cell was showing unusually high pressure readings on March 13. The problem went away just as mysteriously after the solar storm subsided.

The variations in the Earth's magnetic field also tripped circuit breakers on Hydro-Québec's power grid. The utility's very long transmission lines and the fact that most of Quebec sits on a large rock shield prevented current flowing through the Earth, finding a less resistant path along the 735 kV power lines.

The James Bay network went offline in less than 90 seconds, giving Quebec its second massive blackout in 11 months. The power failure lasted 9 hours and forced the company to implement various mitigation strategies, including raising the trip level, installing series compensation on ultra high voltage lines and upgrading various monitoring and operational procedures. Other utilities in North America, the UK, Northern Europe and elsewhere implemented programs to reduce the risks associated with geomagnetically induced currents.

Since 1995, geomagnetic storms and solar flares have been monitored from the Solar and Heliospheric Observatory (SOHO) joint-NASA-European Space Agency satellite.

== August 1989 geomagnetic storm ==
In August 1989, another geomagnetic storm affected microchips, leading to a halt of all trading on Toronto's stock market. This geomagnetic storm was caused by a very large X20 solar flare on August 16, 1989, which was even stronger than the X15 flare from March 6, 1989, referred above.

== Sunquakes discovered ==
"Sunquakes" caused by solar flares were first observed during this cycle. These are running acoustic waves, as opposed to the standing waves that constitute the material of helioseismology. The flare impulse launches these waves from the photosphere, and they arc deeply into the interior of the Sun before refracting back to the surface to appear as faint ripples, expanding radially away from the flare some tens of minutes later. The flare in which these waves were first observed, SOL1996-07-09, occurred more than three years after the last previous major event.

== See also ==
- Solar cycle
- List of solar cycles
