= Solar cycle 12 =

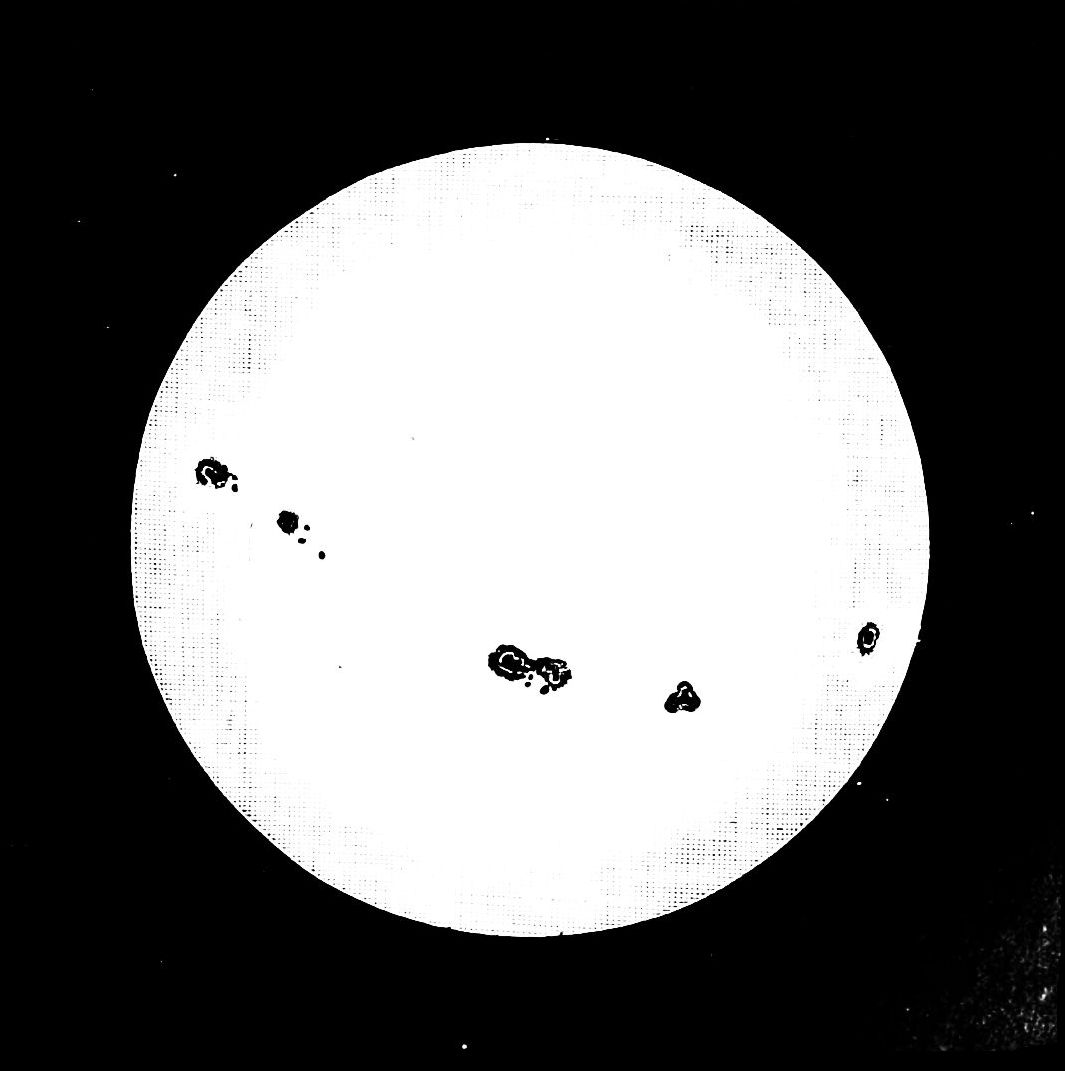
- Sunspots recorded during solar cycle 12 (1 September 1883).

Sunspot data
- Start date: December 1878
- End date: March 1890
- Duration (years): 11.3
- Max count: 124.4
- Max count month: December 1883
- Min count: 3.7
- Spotless days: 736

Cycle chronology
- Previous cycle: Solar cycle 11 (1867-1878)
- Next cycle: Solar cycle 13 (1890-1902)

Solar cycle 12 was the twelfth solar cycle since 1755, when extensive recording of solar sunspot activity began. The solar cycle lasted 11.3 years, beginning in December 1878 and ending in March 1890. The maximum smoothed sunspot number observed during the solar cycle was 124.4 (December 1883), and the starting minimum was 3.7. During the minimum transit from solar cycle 12 to 13, there were a total of 736 days with no sunspots.

== 1882 ==
A very bright blood-red aurora display happened over New York on 16 April 1882, while significant communication disturbances occurred. A geomagnetic storm later in that year produced the aurora of November 17, 1882.

== See also ==
- List of solar cycles
