= Solar cycle 15 =

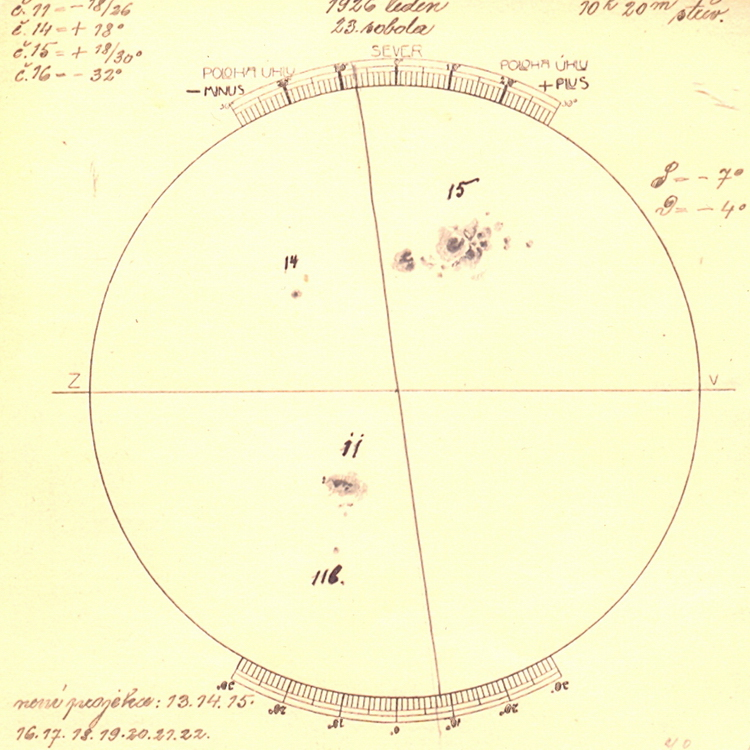
- Sunspots recorded during solar cycle 15 (23 January 1923).

Sunspot data
- Start date: July 1913
- End date: August 1923
- Duration (years): 10.1
- Max count: 175.7
- Max count month: August 1917
- Min count: 2.5
- Spotless days: 534

Cycle chronology
- Previous cycle: Solar cycle 14 (1902–1913)
- Next cycle: Solar cycle 16 (1923–1933)

Solar cycle 15 was the fifteenth solar cycle since 1755, when extensive recording of solar sunspot activity began. The solar cycle lasted 10.1 years, beginning in July 1913 and ending in August 1923. The maximum smoothed sunspot number observed during the solar cycle was 175.7 (August 1917), and the starting minimum was 2.5. During the minimum transit from solar cycle 15 to 16, there were a total of 534 days with no sunspots.

== History ==
Geomagnetic storms in March 1918, August 1919, October 1919, and March 1920 affected telegraph lines, while a solar flare on 13 May 1921 also affected rail signal and switching equipment, in what was known as the "New York Railroad Storm."

=== 1921 ===
A major geomagnetic storm during 13–15 May 1921 caused damage in communication systems and aurora displays in much of the eastern United States.

In Sweden, the event caused major disruptions to the telephone exchange in Karlstad and in the early morning of May 15, the building burned down. Witnesses described the telephone cables going into the building as glowing.

== See also ==
- List of solar cycles
