= Sunspot number =

Measure of sunspot activity

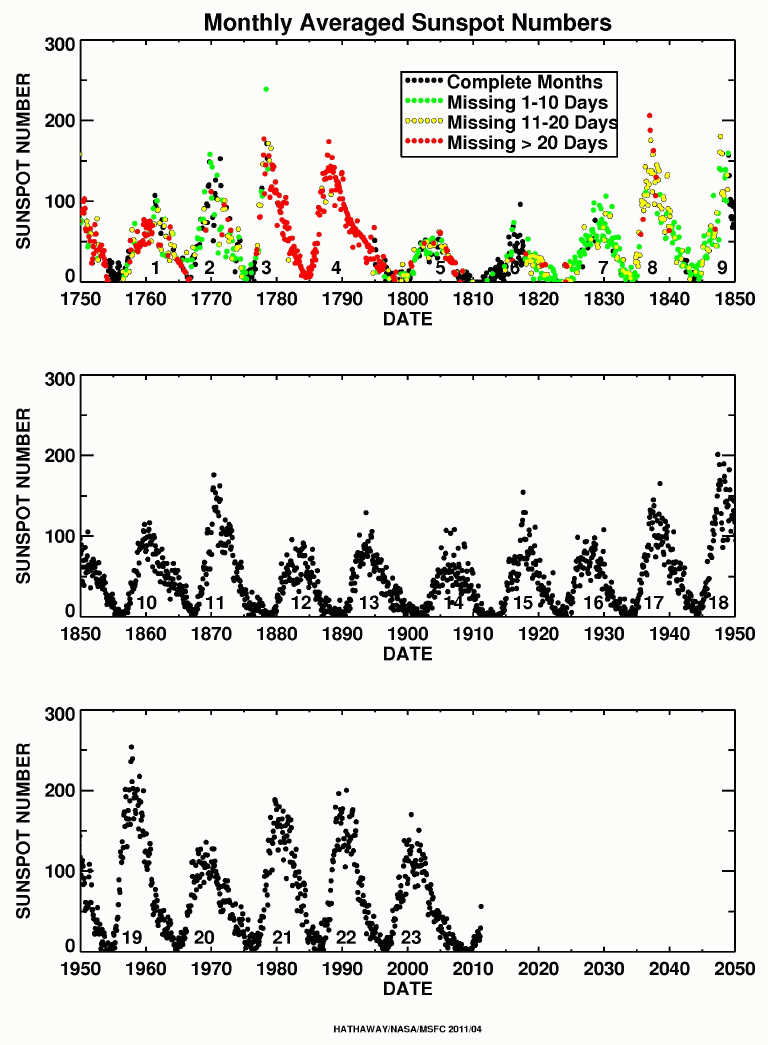
Wolf number since 1750.

The Wolf number (also known as the relative sunspot number or Zürich number) is a quantity that measures the number of sunspots and groups of sunspots present on the surface of the Sun. Historically, it was only possible to detect sunspots on the far side of the Sun indirectly using helioseismology. Since 2006, NASA's STEREO spacecraft allow their direct observation. The sunspot number has been shown to closely correlate with the more widely used S-index, a chromospheric activity indicator based on calcium (Ca II) H&K emission lines.

== History ==
Astronomers have been observing the Sun recording information about sunspots since the advent of the telescope in 1609. However, the idea of compiling the information about the sunspot number from various observers originates in Rudolf Wolf in 1848 in Zürich, Switzerland. The produced series initially had his name, but now it is more commonly referred to as the international sunspot number series.

The international sunspot number series is still being produced today at the observatory of Brussels. The international number series shows an approximate periodicity of 11 years, the solar cycle, which was first found by Heinrich Schwabe in 1843, thus sometimes it is also referred to as the Schwabe cycle. The periodicity is not constant but varies roughly in the range 9.5 to 11 years. The international sunspot number series extends back to 1700 with annual values while daily values exist only since 1818.

Since 1 July 2015 a revised and updated international sunspot number series has been made available. The biggest difference is an overall increase by a factor of 1.6 to the entire series. Traditionally, a scaling of 0.6 was applied to all sunspot counts after 1893, to compensate for Alfred Wolfer's better equipment, after taking over from Wolf. This scaling has been dropped from the revised series, making modern counts closer to their raw values. Also, counts were reduced slightly after 1947 to compensate for bias introduced by a new counting method adopted that year, in which sunspots are weighted according to their size.

== Calculation ==
The relative sunspot number $R$ is computed using the formula

$$R = k(10g + s)$$

where

- $s$ is the number of individual spots,
- $g$ is the number of sunspot groups, and
- $k$ is a factor that varies with observer and is referred to as the observatory factor or the personal reduction coefficient.

The observatory factor compensates for the differing number of recorded individual sunspots and sunspot groups by different observers. These differences in recorded values occur due to differences in instrumentation, local seeing, personal experience, and other factors between observers. Since Wolf was the primary observer for the relative sunspot number, his observatory factor was 1.

=== Smoothed monthly mean ===
To calculate the 13-month smoothed monthly mean sunspot number, which is commonly used to calculate the minima and maxima of solar cycles, a tapered-boxcar smoothing function is used. For a given month $m$, with a monthly sunspot number of $R_m$, the smoothed monthly mean $R_s$ can be expressed as

$$R_s = (0.5 R_{m-6} + R_{m-5} + \dots+ R_{m-1} + R_{m} + R_{m+1} + \dots + R_{m+5} + 0.5 R_{m+6}) / 12$$

where $R_{m+n}$ is the monthly sunspot number $n$ months away from month $m$. The smoothed monthly mean is intended to dampen any sudden jumps in the monthly sunspot number and remove the effects of the 27-day solar rotation period.

== Alternative series ==
The accuracy of the compilation of the group sunspot number series has been questioned, motivating the development of several alternative series suggesting different behavior of sunspot group activity before the 20th century. However, indirect indices of solar activity favor the group sunspot number series by Chatzistergos T. et al.

A different index of sunspot activity was introduced in 1998 in the form of the number of groups apparent on the solar disc. With this index it was made possible to include sunspot data acquired since 1609, being the date of the invention of the telescope.

== See also ==
- Solar cycle
- Joy's law (astronomy)
