= Maurer =

Maurer is a German surname, translating in English to "bricklayer" or "wall builder." Notable people with the surname include:

- Adrian Maurer (1901–1943), American football player
- Alfred Maurer (politician) (1888–1954), Estonian politician
- Alfred Henry Maurer (1868–1932), American artist
- Andreas Maurer (tennis) (born 1958), German tennis player
- Andreas Maurer (Austrian politician) (1919–2010), Austrian politician
- Andreas Maurer (German politician) (born 1970), German local politician
- Andy Maurer (1948–2016), American football player
- Angela Maurer (born 1975), German long-distance swimmer
- Bill Maurer (born 1968), American scholar of legal and economic anthropology
- Brandon Maurer (born 1990), American baseball pitcher
- Chris Maurer (born 1984), bassist, Suburban Legends
- Claude Maurer (born 1975), Swiss sailor
- Daphne Maurer, Canadian experimental psychologist
- Dave Maurer (American football) (1932–2011), American football player and coach
- Dave Maurer (baseball) (born 1975), baseball player
- David Warren Maurer (1906–1981), professor of linguistics
- Dóra Maurer (1937–2026), Hungarian visual artist
- Franciszek Maurer (1918–2010), Polish architect, artist, and professor
- Friedrich Maurer (handballer) (1912–1958), Austrian field handball player
- Friedrich Maurer (linguist) (1898–1984), German linguist and medievalist
- Georg Ludwig von Maurer (1790–1872), German statesman and historian
- Georg Maurer (1907–1971), German poet, essayist, and translator
- German Mäurer (1811–1883), German writer and labor leader
- Hermann Maurer (born 1941), Austrian computer scientist
- Howard Maurer (born 1935), American musician, performer and actor
- Hubert Maurer (1738–1818), German painter, graphic artist and art professor
- Ingo Maurer (1932–2019), German lighting designer
- Ion Gheorghe Maurer (1902–2000), Romanian politician
- Jacqueline Maurer-Mayor (1947–2026), Swiss politician
- James Hudson Maurer (1864–1944), American trade unionist
- Jeff Maurer (born 1947), American businessman
- Jimmy Maurer (born 1988), American soccer player
- Joan Howard Maurer (1927–2021), American writer and actress
- John Maurer (Social Distortion) (born 1961), American punk musician
- John Maurer (jazz musician), American instrumentalist and instructor
- John J. Maurer (1922–2019), American politician
- José Clemente Maurer (1900–1990), German Catholic cardinal
- José Maurer (1906–1968), Argentine actor
- Joshua D. Maurer (born 1964), American film producer, writer and actor
- Jost Maurer, German mason, architect and businessman
- Julius Maximilian Maurer (1857–1938), Swiss meteorologist
- Jürgen Maurer (born 1967), Austrian actor
- Konrad von Maurer (1823–1902), German legal historian and collector of Old Norse folklore
- Kurt Maurer (1926–20??), Swiss footballer
- Lea Maurer (born 1971), American swimmer
- Linus Maurer (1926–2016), American cartoonist
- Louis Maurer (1832–1932), German-born American lithographer
- Lucille Maurer, American politician from Maryland
- Ludwig Maurer (1859–1927), German mathematician
- Ludwig Wilhelm Maurer (1789–1878), German composer, conductor, and violinist
- Marc Maurer (born 1951), American lawyer
- Marco Maurer (born 1988), Swiss ice hockey player
- Mario Maurer (born 1988), Thai actor and model
- Matthias Maurer (born 1970), German astronaut and materials scientist
- Melanie Maurer (born 1988), Swiss cyclist
- Michel Maurer (1904–1983), Luxembourgian boxer
- Mike Maurer (born 1975), Canadian football player
- Neža Maurer (1930–2025), Slovene poet and writer
- Norman Maurer (1926–1986), American writer, director and producer of films and TV shows
- Oscar Maurer (1870–1965), American photographer
- Peter Maurer (born 1956), Swiss diplomat
- Reiner Maurer (born 1960), German football player and manager
- Reinhart Maurer (born 1935), German philosopher
- René Maurer (born 1936), Swiss high jumper
- Rob Maurer (born 1967), American baseball player
- Robert D. Maurer (1924–2025), American scientist, fibre optics
- Sigrid Maurer (born 1985), Austrian politician
- Stefan Maurer (1960–1994), Swiss cyclist
- Steve Maurer (1947–2022), American politician
- Tim Maurer (born 1980), singer, Suburban Legends
- Tommy Maurer (born 1960), American soccer player
- Traudl Maurer (b. 1961), German ski mountaineer
- Ueli Maurer (cryptographer) (born 1960), Swiss computer scientist
- Ueli Maurer (born 1950), Swiss politician
- Uli Maurer (born 1985), German ice hockey player
- Ulrich Mäurer, German lawyer and politician
- Walter Maurer (wrestler) (1893–1983), American wrestler
- Walter Maurer (artist) (born 1942), German designer and academic

== See also ==
- Murer, a list of people with the surname
