= Solar cycle 9 =

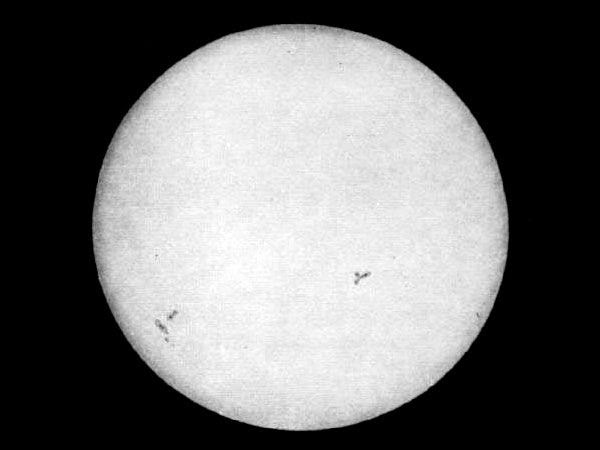
- The Sun in 1845, during solar cycle 9

Sunspot data
- Start date: July 1843
- End date: December 1855
- Duration (years): 12.4
- Max count: 219.9
- Max count month: February 1848
- Min count: 17.6
- Spotless days: 655

Cycle chronology
- Previous cycle: Solar cycle 8 (1833–1843)
- Next cycle: Solar cycle 10 (1855–1867)

During solar cycle 9, Edward Sabine and other scientists linked solar cycles to geomagnetic cycles.

Solar cycle 9 was the ninth solar cycle since 1755, when extensive recording of solar sunspot activity began. The solar cycle lasted 12.4 years, beginning in July 1843 and ending in December 1855. The maximum smoothed sunspot number observed during the solar cycle was 219.9 (February 1848), and the starting minimum was 17.6. During the solar cycle minimum transit from solar cycle 9 to solar cycle 10, there were a total of 655 days with no sunspots.

Solar cycle 9 began in 1843, the year that Heinrich Schwabe discovered the sunspot cycle. During this cycle, Edward Sabine, Rudolf Wolf, and other scientists recognized that solar disturbances affected the Earth's magnetic environment, so that solar cycles are identical to the Earth's geomagnetic cycles. Wolf also introduced the Wolf number during this period.

The phenomenon now known as geomagnetically induced current was seen for the first time during this cycle – it became apparent on the emerging electric telegraph network. Francis Ronalds, Honorary Director of the Kew Observatory and Sabine's colleague, received data from telegraph operators on the movements of their magnetic needles for comparison with his own photo-recordings of atmospheric electricity and geomagnetic intensity variations but had insufficient resources to study the causes of the unexpected currents in detail.

Geomagnetic activity during solar cycle 9 followed a double-peaked distribution, with more magnetic storms during the rising (1847–48) and falling (1851–54) parts of the cycle.

== See also ==
- List of solar cycles
