= Solar cycle 7 =

Sunspot data
- Start date: May 1823
- End date: November 1833
- Duration (years): 10.5
- Max count: 119.2
- Max count month: November 1829
- Min count: 0.2

Cycle chronology
- Previous cycle: Solar cycle 6 (1810–1823)
- Next cycle: Solar cycle 8 (1833–1843)

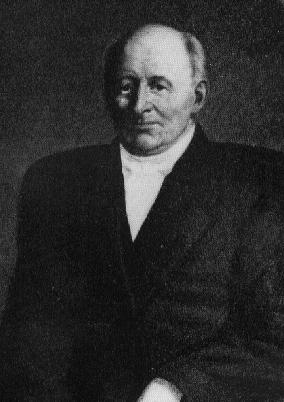
Heinrich Schwabe, who discovered the sunspot cycle, began his personal observations in 1826, during solar cycle 7.

Solar cycle 7 was the seventh solar cycle since 1755, when extensive recording of solar sunspot activity began. The solar cycle lasted 10.5 years, beginning in May 1823 and ending in November 1833 (thus overlapping the Dalton Minimum). The maximum smoothed sunspot number observed during the solar cycle was 119.2 (November 1829), and the starting minimum was 0.2.

== See also ==
- List of solar cycles
