= American Action Fund for Blind Children and Adults =

US non-profit organization

The American Action Fund for Blind Children and Adults is an organization devoted to assisting blind youth, elderly blind and, deaf blind individuals when they are not able to find the assistance they need from governmental agencies or other entities.

The American Action Fund for Blind Children and Adults' name used to be just American Action Fund, but was changed to better identify the groups of individuals for which they provided services. The American Brotherhood for the Blind also later became part of the American Action Fund.

== Programs ==
=== The Kenneth Jernigan Lending Library ===
Named after longtime leader of the National Federation of the Blind, Kenneth Jernigan, this program headquartered in Tarzana, California, will loan out braille books from its library of 40,000 + titles for a period of three months. The books will be sent free of charge.

=== The American Action Fund Free Braille Books program ===
This program based out of Baltimore, Maryland, allows recipients to choose books from three different book series. These books are sent at no charge.
