= Isabelle Grant =

Blind civil rights movement leader

Isabelle Lyon Dean
- Born: July 3, 1896; Lossiemouth, Moray, Scotland
- Died: June 1, 1977 (aged 80)
- Occupations: Activist, Educator
- Known for: Activism for people who are blind

Isabelle Lyon Dean Grant (3 July 1896 — 1 June 1977) was a leader of the blind civil rights movement and worked to improve education for blind children around the world.

== Early life ==
Grant was born in Lossiemouth, a town in Moray, Scotland. Her parents were Jane and William Dean. She had 3 siblings. 3 of her maternal uncles were captains of schooners, while her father was not. He instilled a love of education into Grant during her childhood.

Grant attended public school in her hometown and Elgin Academy. In 1917, she earned a master's degree from University of Aberdeen in English and French. She taught in England and Scotland for 5 years after the completion of her degree. Additionally, she studied at Sorbonne in Paris and the University of Madrid, where she became fluent in Spanish.

She moved to the United States in 1924 with her husband aboard the SS Californian. They settled in Los Angeles. Grant earned her PhD in comparative literature from the University of Southern California in 1940.

== Career ==
Grant was the first blind person to teach in the California Public School system. She began as a teacher in the Los Angeles, California public school system in 1927. She was an advocate for Mexican American students and often went with them to court if they got into trouble.

Due to her vision loss in the 1940s, she was forced from her position as Vice Principal at Belvedere Junior High School into early retirement by the Board of Education. The National Federation of the Blind and the Belvedere Junior High School Faculty Club fought the Board of Education to keep her out of forced disability retirement. They retained her, and she ended up working for thirteen years as a teacher for blind students. In February 1949, Grant was removed from her teaching position at Belvedere and placed at Polytechnic High School. Due to misconceptions of blindness, Grant was moved forced from school to school. She was required to have a sighted adult in the classroom at all times as a safety precaution.

She was a skilled teacher. Once students showed improvement, they were removed from her classroom. She retired from teaching in June 1962. Her teaching career spanned thirty-two years. During her retirement celebration, her colleagues gave her a book filled with letters of appreciation. In August 1962, she received a Fulbright-Hays Fellowship to educate teachers in Pakistan about teaching blind children. In 1964, she received another Fulbright Fellowship to continue her work in Pakistan.

== Activism ==
Due to her experiences as a teacher who was blind, Grant worked on legislative and organizational efforts so that blind teachers would not have to experience such discrimination in the workplace. In conjunction with the California Council of the Blind, Grant fought to get the California legislature to eliminate discriminatory practices for teachers who are blind. The California legislature passed legislation to remove the requirement that teachers be keenly sighted in order to be certified as teachers and banned discrimination for teachers in the university application process, their education, and their job search process.

Grant felt blind students should be educated alongside their sighted peers. She believed this helps to prepare the children who are blind to live in a sighted world. This was most positively received in developing countries where they lacked funding to build separate schools for blind students.

Before she retired from teaching, Grant took a sabbatical from teaching in 1959 to travel around the world with her white cane she lovingly named Oscar. She was in Pakistan from September 1959 to February 1960 organizing the Pakistan Association of the Blind. The aim of her trip was to learn as much as she could about education in the countries she visited. Her particular interest was in the education of children who are blind. At the time of her trip, she had been completely blind for twelve years, and society considered women and people who were blind too helpless to travel alone. During one of her yearlong trips, she visited twenty-three countries, including Great Britain, Fiji, India, Myanmar, and Pakistan.

In 1967, Jacobus tenBroek, who was president of the National Federation of the Blind and the International Federation of the Blind, asked Grant to travel to Africa to report on education of blind children in Africa and the overall acceptance of blind people in society, as well as their options for independence. For this trip, The American Action Fund for Blind Children provided Grant with a $2,000 stipend for her travel and expenses. After her trip ended, she continued her humanitarian efforts from California. She would collect Braille books, typewriters, music, paper, watches, and folding canes. Some of these items she would send to people who needed them in the United States. Other items she sent to other countries. Due to these efforts, Grant helped to establish Braille libraries in 65 countries.

In 1964, Grant became the first woman to receive the Newell Perry award from the National Federation of the Blind. She was named International Teacher of 1967. She was nominated for the Nobel Peace Prize in 1972.

Due to her humanitarian efforts, she was known to correspond with about 800 people in seven different languages. On her travels, she spoke about the "White Cane Law" and the National Federation of the Blind in order to spread the awareness of rights for blind people.

Grant wrote a book about her world travel with only her white cane accompanying her. There were challenges to writing her book, from Braille notes being flattened from the humidity in the tropical climate where she traveled to difficulty finding a publisher. Her book was not published until 2016, nearly forty years after her death.

== Awards ==
Newel Perry award, National Federation of the Blind, 1964

International Teacher of 1967

Nominated for the Nobel Peace Prize in 1972

== Personal life ==
Grant was married to a physician, Alexander Grant. Together they had one daughter, Jane Susannah "Hermione" Grant, born in 1930. Her husband died in 1946. Grant lost her vision in 1948 due to Glaucoma.

== Death ==
Isabelle Grant died in 1977, on the day before she was to leave for New York to present to the United Nations about the needs of people who are blind.

== Publications ==
Grant, I.L.D. (1954). Some Considerations and Recommendations in the Education of Blind Children. CCB Committee on Educational Policy.

Grant, I.L.D. (1956). Education of Blind Children in the Public Schools: A Teacher's Viewpoint. CCB Annual Convention

Grant, I.L.D. (1969). A White Paper for the Education of Our Blind Children. IFB Convention in Ceylon.

Grant, I.L.D. Quotes from My African Letters.

Grant, I.L.D. (2016). Crooked Paths Made Straight: A Blind Teachers Adventures Traveling Around the World.
