= Solar cycle 1 =

Sunspot data
- Start date: February 1755
- End date: June 1766
- Duration (years): 11.3
- Max count: 144.1
- Max count month: June 1761
- Min count: 14.0

Cycle chronology
- Next cycle: Solar cycle 2 (1766–1775)

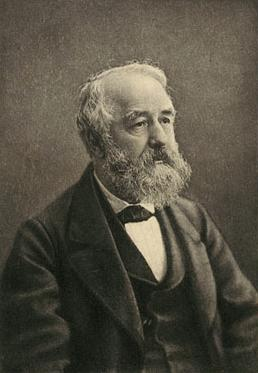
Johann Rudolf Wolf defined the list of numbered solar cycles.

Solar cycle 1 was the first solar cycle during which extensive recording of solar sunspot activity took place. The solar cycle lasted 11.3 years, beginning in February 1755 and ending in June 1766. The maximum smoothed sunspot number observed during the solar cycle was 144.1 (June 1761), and the starting minimum was 14.0.

Solar cycle 1 was discovered by Johann Rudolph Wolf who, inspired by the discovery of the solar cycle by Heinrich Schwabe in 1843, collected all available sunspot observations going back to the first telescopic observations by Galileo. He was able to improve Schwabe's estimate of the mean length of the cycle from about a decade to 11.11 years. However, he could not find enough observations before 1755 to reliably identify cycles, hence the 1755–1766 cycle is conventionally numbered as cycle 1. Wolf published his results in 1852.

== See also ==
- List of solar cycles
