= John Maurer =

John Maurer may refer to:

- John Maurer (Social Distortion) (born 1961), American punk musician
- John Maurer (jazz musician), American instrumentalist and instructor
- John J. Maurer (1922–2019), American politician

== See also ==
- John Mauer
