= Iowa Commission for the Blind Building =

- U.S. National Register of Historic Places
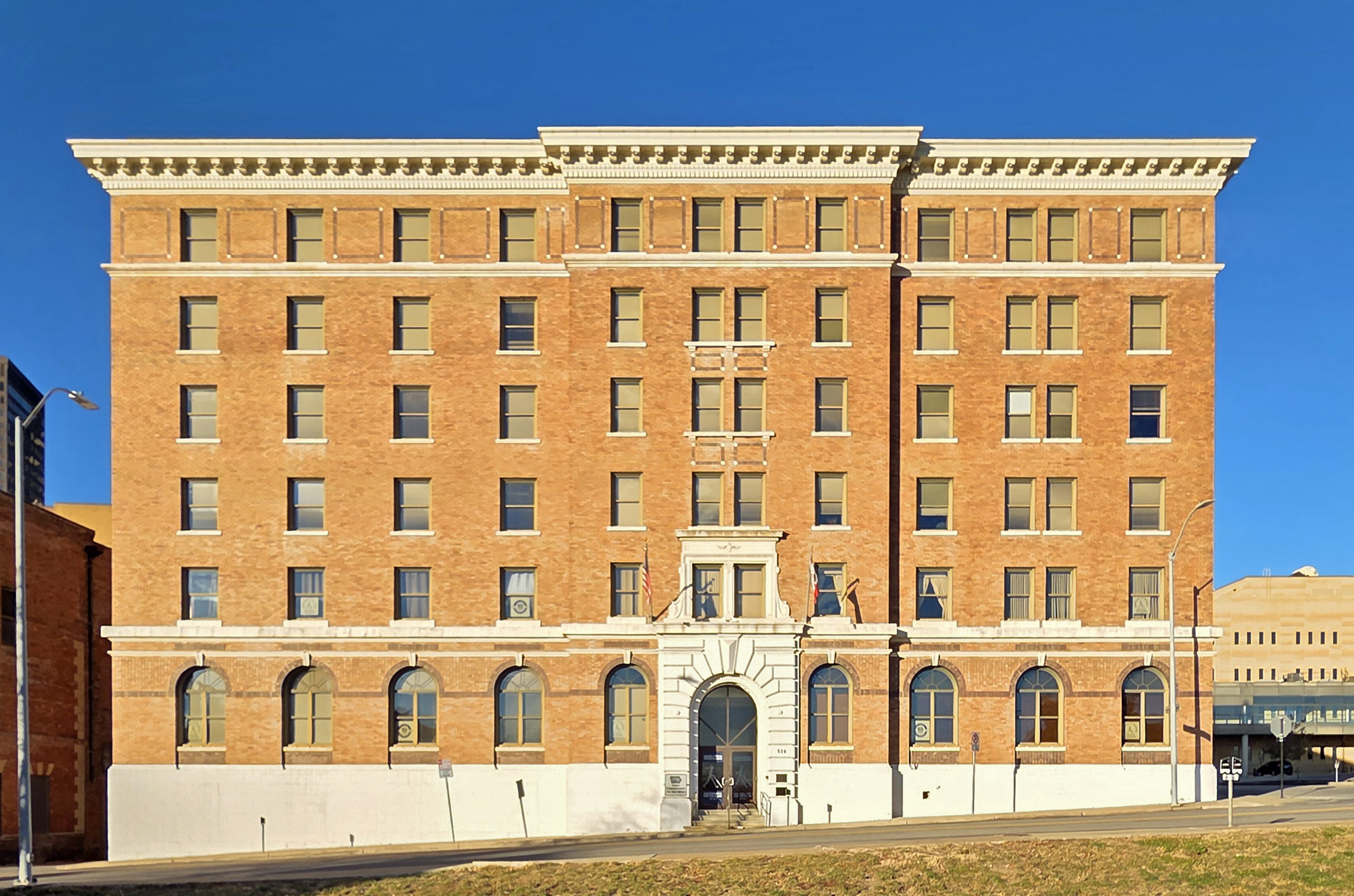
- The Iowa Commission for the Blind Building from the east

- Location within Iowa Location within the United States
- Location: 524 4th Street, Des Moines, Iowa
- Coordinates: 41°35′20″N 93°37′22″W
- Area: less than one acre
- Built: 1913
- Architect: Proudfoot, Bird & Rawson
- Architectural style: Classical Revival
- NRHP reference No.: 09000714
- Added to NRHP: July 1, 2010

The Iowa Commission for the Blind Building is a historic building in downtown Des Moines, Iowa, United States. The building is a steel-framed structure covered in brick. It is a nine-story state government office building that rises 95 feet (29 m) above the ground.

== History ==
The building was completed in 1913 for use by the YMCA. It was designed by the Des Moines architectural firm of Proudfoot, Bird & Rawson in the Neoclassical style. When the YMCA moved to their present location in 1959, the state acquired the building for the Iowa Commission for the Blind. It was here that the commission, under the direction of Dr. Kenneth Jernigan transformed rehabilitation services for the blind in the state into what became known as the Iowa Model. It is based on the belief that with the proper training and opportunity, the blind can live productive and successful lives. The building was listed on the National Register of Historic Places in 2000.
