= Solar cycle 8 =

Sunspot data
- Start date: November 1833
- End date: July 1843
- Duration (years): 9.7
- Max count: 244.9
- Max count month: March 1837
- Min count: 12.2

Cycle chronology
- Previous cycle: Solar cycle 7 (1823–1833)
- Next cycle: Solar cycle 9 (1843–1855)

Solar cycle 8 was the eighth solar cycle since 1755, when extensive recording of solar sunspot activity began. The solar cycle lasted 9.7 years, beginning in November 1833 and ending in July 1843. The maximum smoothed sunspot number observed during the solar cycle was 244.9 (March 1837), and the starting minimum was 12.2.

Solar cycle 8 ended in 1843, the year that Heinrich Schwabe discovered the sunspot cycle.

== See also ==
- List of solar cycles
