= Solar cycle 5 =

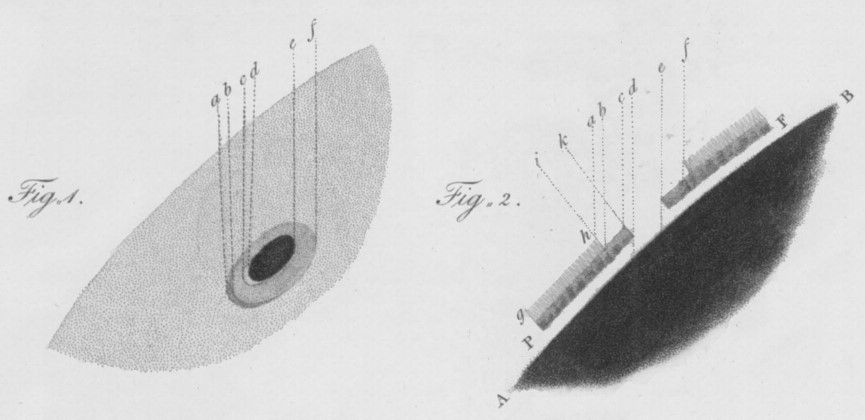
- Sunspots drawn by William Herschel, 1801

Sunspot data
- Start date: April 1798
- End date: August 1810
- Duration (years): 12.3
- Max count: 82.0
- Max count month: February 1805
- Min count: 5.3

Cycle chronology
- Previous cycle: Solar cycle 4 (1784–1798)
- Next cycle: Solar cycle 6 (1810–1823)

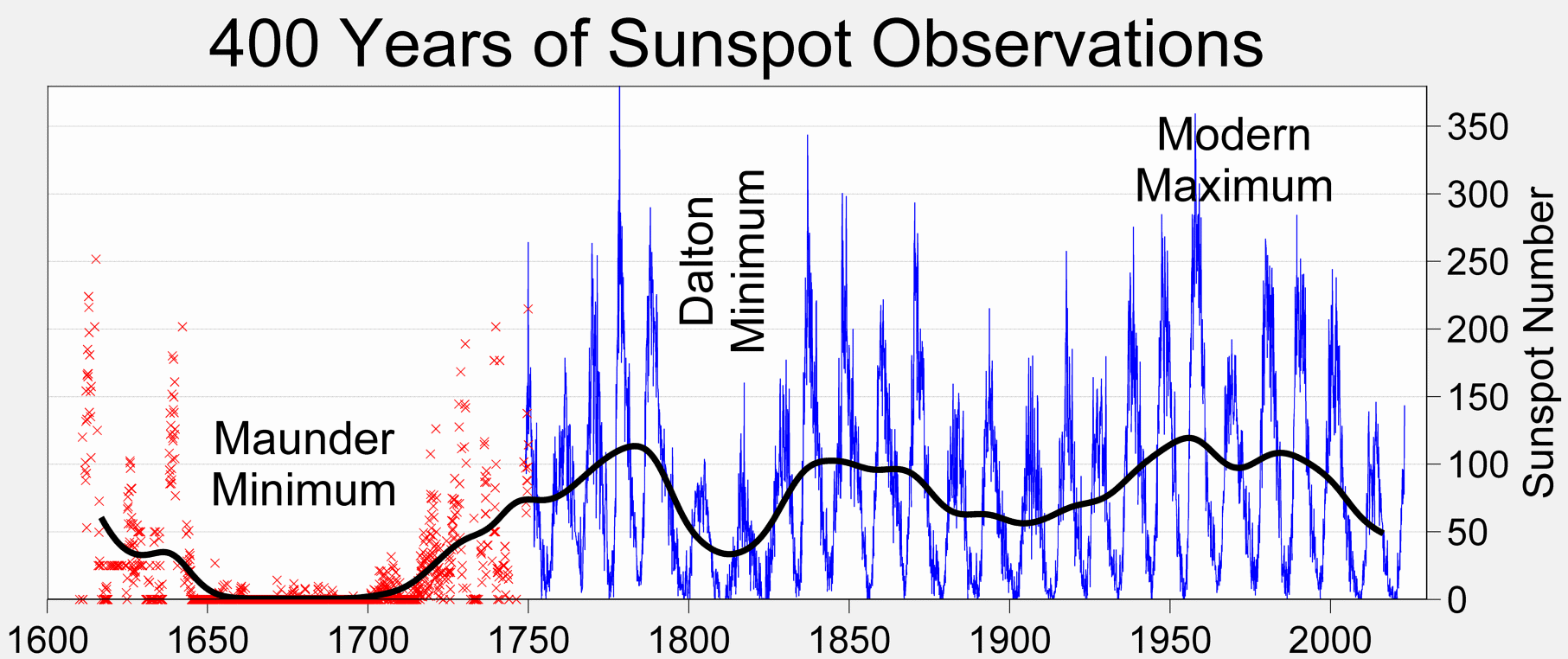
The Dalton minimum in the 400-year history of sunspot numbers, showing the low peaks for solar cycles 5 and 6.

Solar cycle 5 was the fifth solar cycle since 1755, when extensive recording of solar sunspot activity began. The solar cycle lasted 12.3 years, beginning in April 1798 and ending in August 1810 (thus falling within the Dalton Minimum). The maximum smoothed sunspot number observed during the solar cycle was 82.0, in February 1805 (the third-lowest of any cycle to date, behind solar cycle 6 and solar cycle 24, as a result of being part of the Dalton Minimum), and the starting minimum was 5.3.

== See also ==
- List of solar cycles
