= Solar cycle 6 =

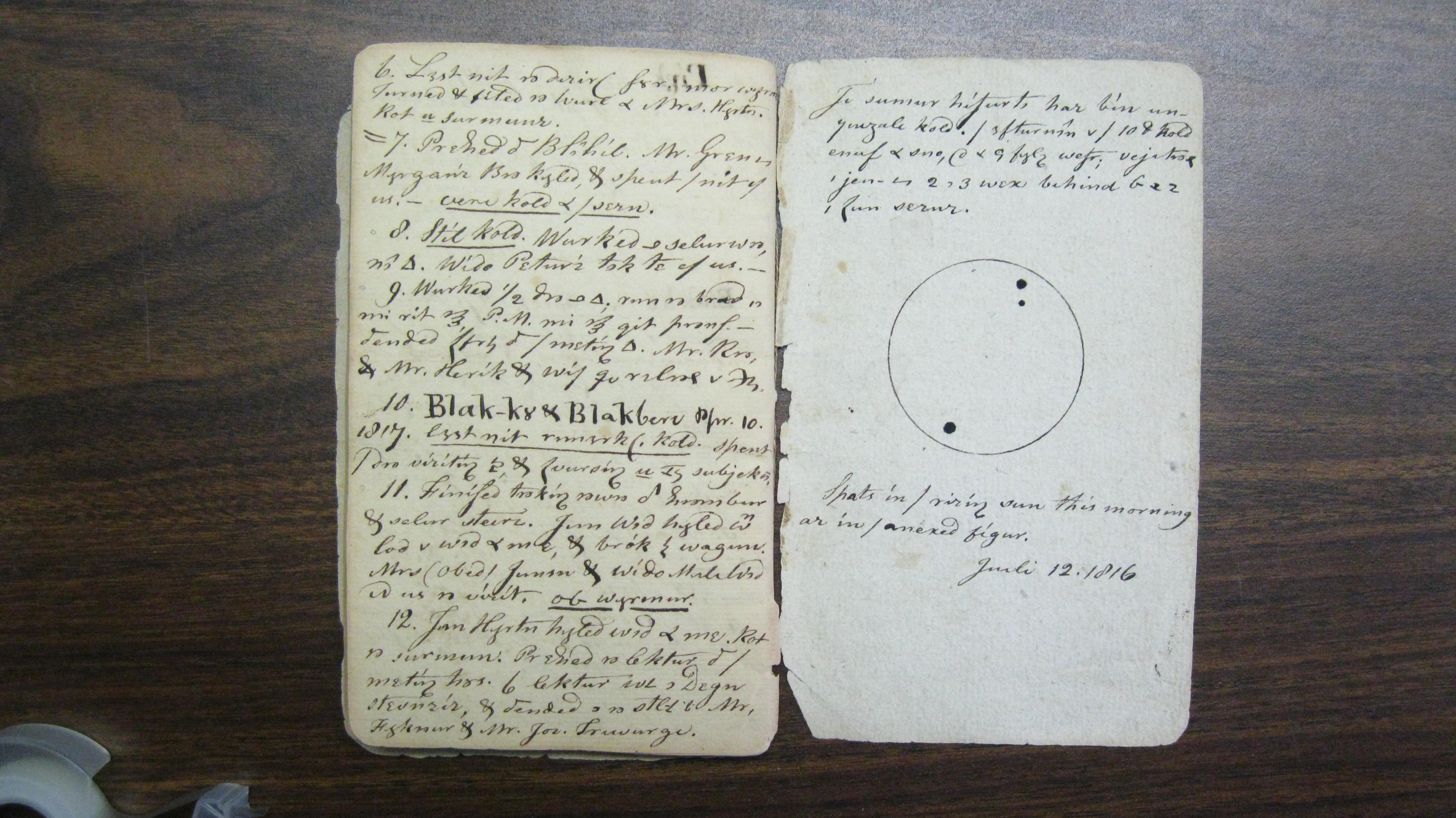
- Drawing of sunspots by Jonathan Fisher during the Year Without a Summer (1816)

Sunspot data
- Start date: August 1810
- End date: May 1823
- Duration (years): 12.8
- Max count: 81.2
- Max count month: May 1816
- Min count: 0.0

Cycle chronology
- Previous cycle: Solar cycle 5 (1798–1810)
- Next cycle: Solar cycle 7 (1823–1833)

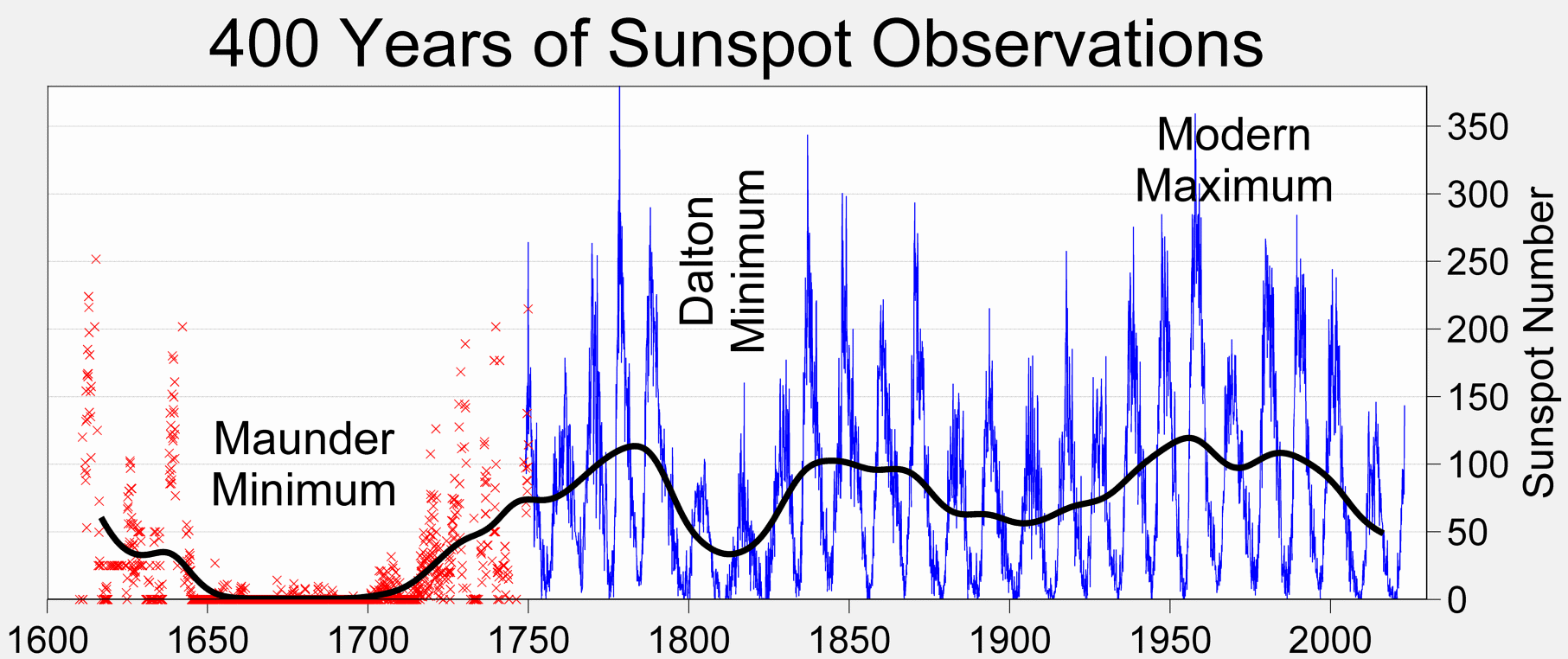
The Dalton minimum in the 400-year history of sunspot numbers, showing the low peaks for solar cycles 5 and 6.

Solar cycle 6 was the sixth solar cycle since 1755, when extensive recording of solar sunspot activity began. The solar cycle lasted 12.8 years, beginning in August 1810 and ending in May 1823 (thus falling within the Dalton Minimum). The maximum smoothed sunspot number observed during the solar cycle was 81.2, in May 1816 (the lowest of any cycle to date, as a result of being part of the Dalton Minimum), and the starting minimum was 0.0.

== See also ==
- List of solar cycles
