= American Council of the Blind =

American nonprofit organization

The American Council of the Blind (ACB) is a nationwide organization in the United States. It is an organization mainly made up of blind and visually impaired people who want to achieve independence and equality (although there are many sighted members with common aims).

== History ==
The American Council of the Blind was formed out of the dissolution of the Braille Free Press Association in 1961. Braille Free Press had been set up in 1959. It was highly critical of the American Foundation for the Blind, and the ACB was formed as an alternative to it.

The ACB was also very critical of the National Federation of the Blind which many of its first members had also originally belonged to. Relations between the two organizations have been strained ever since—to the extent that they tend to schedule their conventions at the same time, to deter people from being active in both organizations.

In 2013 the ACB elected Kim Charlson as its first female president, making her the first female president of a major national blindness consumer advocacy organization in the United States.

== State affiliates ==
- Alabama Council of the Blind
- Alaska Independent Blind, Inc.
- Arizona Council of the Blind
- Arkansas Council of the Blind
- California Council of the Blind
- American Council of the Blind of Colorado, Inc.
- Connecticut Council of the Blind
- Delaware Council of the Blind and Visually Impaired
- DC Council of the Blind
- Florida Council of the Blind
- Georgia Council of the Blind
- Hawaii Association of the Blind
- Illinois Council of the Blind
- ACB of Indiana
- Iowa Council of the United Blind
- Kansas Association of the Blind and Visually Impaired
- Blue Grass Council of the Blind
- Kentucky Council of the Blind
- Louisiana Council of the Blind
- ACB of Maine
- ACB of Maryland
- Bay State Council of the Blind
- Michigan Council of the Blind And Visually Impaired
- ACB of Minnesota
- Mississippi Council of the Blind
- Missouri Council of the Blind
- Montana Blind and Low Vision Council
- ACB of Nebraska
- Nevada Council of the Blind
- New Jersey Council of the Blind
- ACB of New Mexico
- ACB of New York, Inc.
- North Carolina Council of the Blind
- North Dakota Association of the Blind
- ACB of Ohio
- Oklahoma Council of the Blind
- ACB of Oregon
- Pennsylvania Council of the Blind
- ACB of South Carolina
- South Dakota Association of the Blind
- Tennessee Council of the Blind
- ACB of Texas
- Utah Council of the Blind
- Vermont Council of the Blind
- American Council of the Blind of Virginia
- Virginia Association of the Blind
- Washington Council of the Blind
- Mountain State Council of the Blind
- Washington Council of the Blind
- ACB of Wisconsin
- Wyoming Council of the Blind

== Special Interest affiliates ==
- Alliance on Aging and Vision Loss
- American Association of Blind Teachers
- American Association of Visually Impaired Attorneys
- ACB Diabetics in Action
- ACB Families
- ACB Government Employees
- ACB Next Generation
- American Council of Blind Lions
- ACB Radio Amateurs
- ACB Students
- Blind Information Technology Specialists
- Braille Revival League
- Council of Citizens with Low Vision International
- Friends In Art of ACB, Inc.
- Guide Dog Users, Inc.
- Independent Visually Impaired Entrepreneurs
- Library Users of America
- Randolph-Sheppard Vendors of America
