= Chichester Canal (painting) =

Painting by J. M. W. Turner

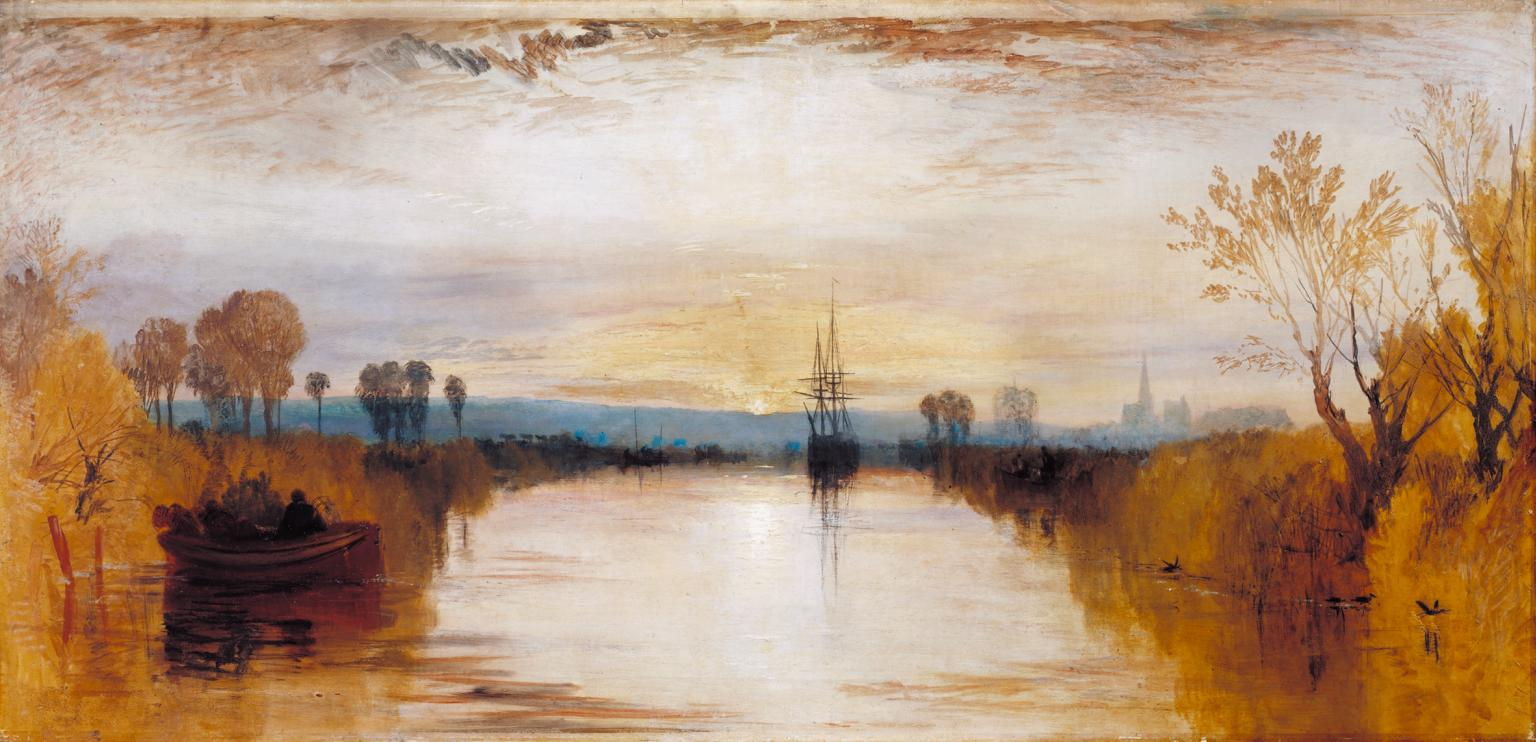
- Artist: J. M. W. Turner
- Year: 1828
- Medium: Oil on canvas
- Dimensions: 65.4 cm × 134.6 cm (25.7 in × 53.0 in)
- Location: Tate Gallery, London
- Accession: N00560
- Website: tate.org.uk/...n00560

Chichester Canal is a painting by the English Romantic landscape painter, watercolourist and printmaker J. M. W. Turner. It was painted in 1828 and was commissioned by George Wyndham, 3rd Earl of Egremont. It is now in the Tate Collection.

The work depicts the Chichester Canal in Sussex, southern England. The ship is probably a collier brig, as this serene scene had commercial purpose. Its brilliant colours may have been influenced by atmospheric ash from the eruption of Mount Tambora in Indonesia (see also Year Without a Summer).

The painting is an initial version of the final composition in Petworth House.

== See also ==
- List of paintings by J. M. W. Turner
