= Julius Maximilian Maurer =

German-Swiss meteorologist (1857–1938)

Julius Maximilian Maurer (14 July 1857 – 21 January 1938) was a German-Swiss meteorologist who headed the central meteorological institute in Zurich. He specialized in the study of solar radiation and contributed to long term climatological study in Switzerland.

== Biography ==
Maurer was born in Freiburg, Breisgau but grew up in Zurich, Switzerland where the family moved in 1858. His father Joseph ran the Kleine Sonne ["little sun"] inn. He met an assistant of the Swiss observatory at the inn and became interested in astronomy at an early age. Educated at the Technische Hochschule at Zurich, he then went to study astronomy at the University where he was influenced by Rudolf Wolf. He then became an assistant at the observatory in Zurich from 1879. He studied the reduction of starlight due to the atmosphere and received a doctorate in 1882, having joined the Swiss Central Meteorological Institute in 1881, becoming its director from 1905 (following the death of Robert Billwiller) until his retirement in 1934.

Maurer worked on the climatology of Switzerland in collaboration with Robert Billwiller, Jr., and Clemens Hess, resulting in an influential two volume work, Das Klima der Schweiz (1909–10), that looked at glaciation, and lake freezing. He also examined radiation examining solar insolation and nightly heat loss.
