= Marc Maurer =

American activist (born 1951)

Marc Maurer was the president of the National Federation of the Blind (NFB), the oldest and largest membership organization of blind people in the U.S., from 1986 until 2014. He also works as an attorney specializing in civil rights law and issues related to blindness.

== Early life ==
Maurer was born in 1951 in Iowa, and has been blind since shortly after birth. Maurer became active in the Iowa chapter of the National Federation of the Blind as a teenager.

== Education ==
Maurer graduated cum laude from the University of Notre Dame in 1974. As an undergraduate he took an active part in campus life, including election to the Honor Society. Then he enrolled at the Indiana University School of Law at Indianapolis, where he received his Doctor of Jurisprudence in 1977.

In 2010 he received honorary doctor of laws degrees from the University of South Carolina Upstate and The University of Notre Dame.

== Career ==
Maurer has worked as a lawyer in Ohio, Washington, DC, and Baltimore, Maryland. At the NFB's 1985 national convention, previous president Kenneth Jernigan announced that he would step down as president, and endorsed Maurer as his successor. At the following year's convention, the membership elected Maurer as its new president. Notable accomplishments of his tenure as president have been the building of the NFB's Jernigan Institute for research and the development of the Kurzweil-National Federation of the Blind Reader with inventor Ray Kurzweil.

Maurer is a member of the bar in Indiana, Ohio, Iowa, Maryland, and the Bar of the Supreme Court of the United States.
