= Solar cycle 3 =

Sunspot data
- Start date: June 1775
- End date: September 1784
- Duration (years): 9.3
- Max count: 264.3
- Max count month: May 1778
- Min count: 12.0

Cycle chronology
- Previous cycle: Solar cycle 2 (1766–1775)
- Next cycle: Solar cycle 4 (1784–1798)

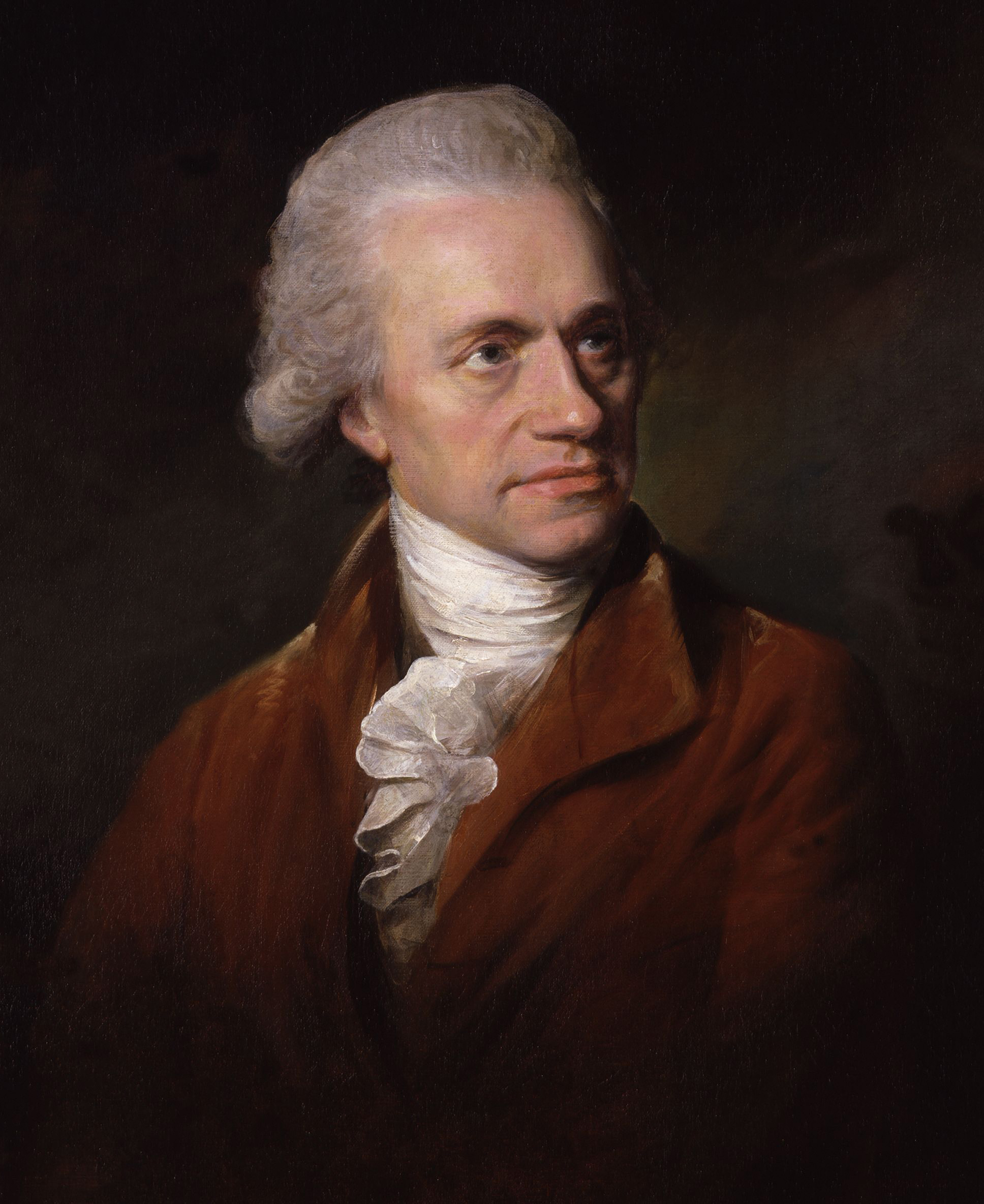
William Herschel began observing sunspots during this period.

Solar cycle 3 was the third solar cycle since 1755, when extensive recording of solar sunspot activity began. The solar cycle lasted 9.3 years, beginning in June 1775 and ending in September 1784. The maximum smoothed sunspot number observed during the solar cycle was 264.3 (May 1778), and the starting minimum was 12.0.

William Herschel began observing sunspots during this period.

== See also ==
- List of solar cycles
