= Murer =

Murer is a surname. Notable people with the surname include:

- Eugène Murer (1841–1906), French pastry chef, author, self-taught painter and collector of impressionist paintings, born Hyacinthe-Eugène Meunier
- Fabiana Murer (born 1981), Brazilian retired pole vaulter
- Franz Murer (1912–1994), Austrian World War II SS non-commissioned officer in charge of the Vilno Ghetto
- Fredi M. Murer (born 1940), Swiss filmmaker
- Henny Mürer (1925–1997), Norwegian choreographer and dancer
- Jos Murer (1530–1580), Zürich poet, topographer, stained glass maker and mathematician

== See also ==
- Maurer, another surname
- Dani Morer (born 1998), Spanish footballer
- Pau Morer (born 1995), Spanish footballer
