= Jacobus tenBroek =

American activist, historian, political scientist (1911–1968)

- Born: July 6, 1911; Alberta, Canada
- Died: March 27, 1968 (aged 56); Berkeley, California
- Occupations: Activist, Author, Professor
- Known for: Activism for individuals with disabilities

Jacobus tenBroek (1911–1968) was an American disability rights activist, historian and political scientist.

== Early life ==
TenBroek was born in Alberta, Canada in 1911. He became partially blind at the age of 7 due to an accident with a bow and arrow. His remaining eyesight deteriorated, and he was completely blind by age 14. His mother decided to move the family to California so tenBroek could attend a state school for the blind.

In 1934, tenBroek graduated from the University of California with a degree in history. He graduated with the highest honors. He went on to earn a master's degree in political science and a Bachelor of Laws and Doctor of Juridical Science degree from University of California Berkeley School of Law. He continued to review honors after graduation. He was on the California Law Review, was a member of the Order of the Coif, and earned a Brandeis Research Fellowship with Harvard University.

== Career ==
TenBroek served on the faculty of the Chicago Law School. California Governor Earl Warren appointed tenBroek to the California Social Welfare Board. From 1960 to 1963, he was chairman of the Board. During his career, he published over fifty articles. His book Prejudice, War and the Constitution received the Woodrow Wilson Award. He was with the University of California at Berkeley for 25 years, from 1942 until his death. During that time, he became full professor in 1953 and chairman of the department of speech in 1955.

== Activism ==
During his career, he focused on subjects that were not yet being written about by scholars. He brought attention to the field of welfare and raised awareness to the deprived citizens in society. He wrote scholarly material about the origins of the Thirteenth Amendment and the Fourteenth Amendment to the United States Constitution. His book The Antislavery Origins of the Fourteenth Amendment was cited by Thurgood Marshall in the Brown v. Board of Education case and regularly cited by the United States Department of Justice. His writings affected much scholarship and attention around civil rights law and welfare rights law.

In 1934, he worked with a few others to organize the California Council of the Blind. In 1940 he began organizing the National Federation of the Blind. He later began organizing the International Federation of the Blind in 1964.

He stood for academic freedom and opposed the loyalty oath in the 1950s.

His 1958 book critiqued the Supreme Court's decision regarding the imprisonment of Japanese Americans during World War II.

During the student strike supporting the Free Speech Movement asserting the right of students to promote political causes in Sproul Plaza on the University of California Berkeley campus, Dr. tenBroek was not among the faculty members who cancelled classes in support of the strikers. He explained in class when asked by a student why he was holding class that the high level of interest created by the demonstrations provided a good opportunity for learning.<Warren Deras, a student in the class and later a researcher for Dr. tenBroek>

TenBroek wrote in his 1966 article "The Right to Live in the World: The Disabled in the Law of Torts", that the doctrines in the law of torts ought to be reviewed and revised to address the modern societal integration of disabled people into society.

== tenBroek Papers ==
Throughout his life, tenBroek collected documentation about the early history of the National Federation of the Blind and the blind civil rights movement. After his death, his wife continued collecting papers for the collection, which is now housed at the Jacobus tenBroek Library within the Jernigan Institute. Research specialist at the Jacobus tenBroek Library, Lou Ann Blake, catalogued the collection. Printed, the collection took up thirty-five four-drawer file cabinets and four two-drawer file cabinets. Some of the more important documents are now archived in a temperature- and humidity-controlled room within the Jernigan Institute. Scholars have visited the collection to research activists in the blind civil rights movement, including Isabelle Grant and the first executive director of the National Federation of the Blind, Raymond Henderson. Some of the papers are personal correspondence of tenBroek with family, friends, jurists, authors, politicians, and members of Congress.

== Personal life ==
In 1937, tenBroek married Hazel Feldheym. Later, Feldheym served as associate editor of the journal the Braille Monitor. Together tenBroek and Feldheym had three children: Jacobus Zivnuska, Anna Carlotta (Hammond), and Nicolaas Perry.

== Death ==
TenBroek died from cancer on March 27, 1968, at the age of 56.

== Publications ==
=== Books ===
- tenBroek, J. (1951). The Antislavery Origins of the Fourteenth Amendment. University of California Press.
- tenBroek, J., Barnhart, E.N., & Matson, F.W. (1958). Japanese American Evacuation and Resettlement Prejudice, War and the Constitution. University of California.
- tenBroek, J. (1959). Hope Deferred: Public Welfare and the Blind.
- tenBroek, J. (1964). California's Dual System of Family Law.
- tenBroek, J. (1965). Equal Under Law. Collier Books.
- tenBroek, J., Barnhart, E.N., & Matson, F.W. (1970). Prejudice, War and the Constitution: Causes and Consequences of the Evacuation of the Japanese Americans in World War II. University of California Press.

=== Articles ===
- tenBroek, J. (1966). The Right to Live in the World: The Disabled in the Law of Torts. California Law Review: 54(2).
