= Solar cycle 2 =

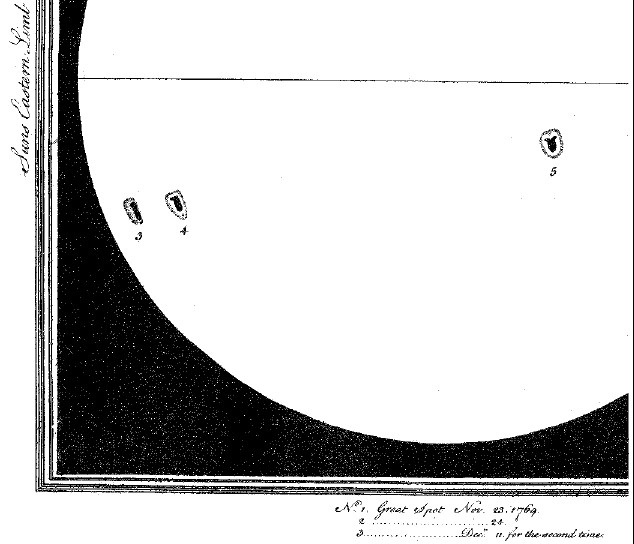
- Drawing of a sunspot from 1774, illustrating the Wilson effect

Sunspot data
- Start date: June 1766
- End date: June 1775
- Duration (years): 9
- Max count: 193.0
- Max count month: September 1769
- Min count: 18.6

Cycle chronology
- Previous cycle: Solar cycle 1 (1755–1766)
- Next cycle: Solar cycle 3 (1775–1784)

Solar cycle 2 was the second solar cycle since 1755, when extensive recording of sunspot activity began. The solar cycle lasted 9 years, beginning in June 1766 and ending in June 1775. The maximum smoothed sunspot number observed during the solar cycle was 193.0 (September 1769), and the starting minimum was 18.6.

Sunspot observations by Alexander Wilson during this period established the Wilson effect.

== See also ==
- List of solar cycles
