= Solar cycle 4 =

Sunspot data
- Start date: September 1784
- End date: April 1798
- Duration (years): 13.6
- Max count: 235.3
- Max count month: February 1788
- Min count: 15.9

Cycle chronology
- Previous cycle: Solar cycle 3 (1775–1784)
- Next cycle: Solar cycle 5 (1798–1810)

Solar cycle 4 was the fourth solar cycle since 1755, when extensive recording of solar sunspot activity began. The solar cycle lasted 13.6 years, beginning in September 1784 and ending in April 1798 (thus overlapping the Dalton Minimum). The maximum smoothed sunspot number observed during the solar cycle was 235.3 (in February 1788), and the starting minimum was 15.9.

There are some recent speculations that cycle 4, the longest solar cycle since 1755, was actually two cycles, based on the appearance of new sunspots at high solar latitudes in 1793–1796 and a reconstruction of the sunspot butterfly diagram for cycles 3 and 4, although total sunspot numbers only show a single-peaked distribution.

== See also ==
- List of solar cycles
