= Kenneth Jernigan =

Leader of the National Federation of the Blind

- Born: Norman Kenneth Jernigan; November 13, 1926; Detroit, Michigan, US
- Died: October 12, 1998 (aged 71); Baltimore, Maryland, US
- Education: Tennessee Technological University (B.A.); Peabody College (M.A.)
- Occupation: President of the National Federation of the Blind
- Spouse: Mary Ellen Jernigan

Norman Kenneth Jernigan (November 13, 1926 – October 12, 1998) was the longtime leader of the National Federation of the Blind, the largest and oldest blind people's organization in the United States.

== Early life ==
Kenneth Jernigan was born blind in Detroit, Michigan, but grew up on a farm in Tennessee. Beginning at the age of six, he was educated at the Tennessee School for the Blind in Nashville, Tennessee. In 1945, he began attending Tennessee Tech University in Cookeville, Tennessee and graduated cum laude three years later. In 1949, he earned a master's degree in English from Peabody College in Nashville.

Upon graduation from Peabody, he taught high school English at the Tennessee School for the Blind in Nashville for four years. During this time, he joined the National Federation of the Blind of Tennessee, eventually serving as its vice-president in 1950 and President one year later. In 1952, he was elected to the board of directors. He moved to Oakland, California in 1953 and joined the faculty of the newly established California Orientation Center for Blind Adults.

== Career ==
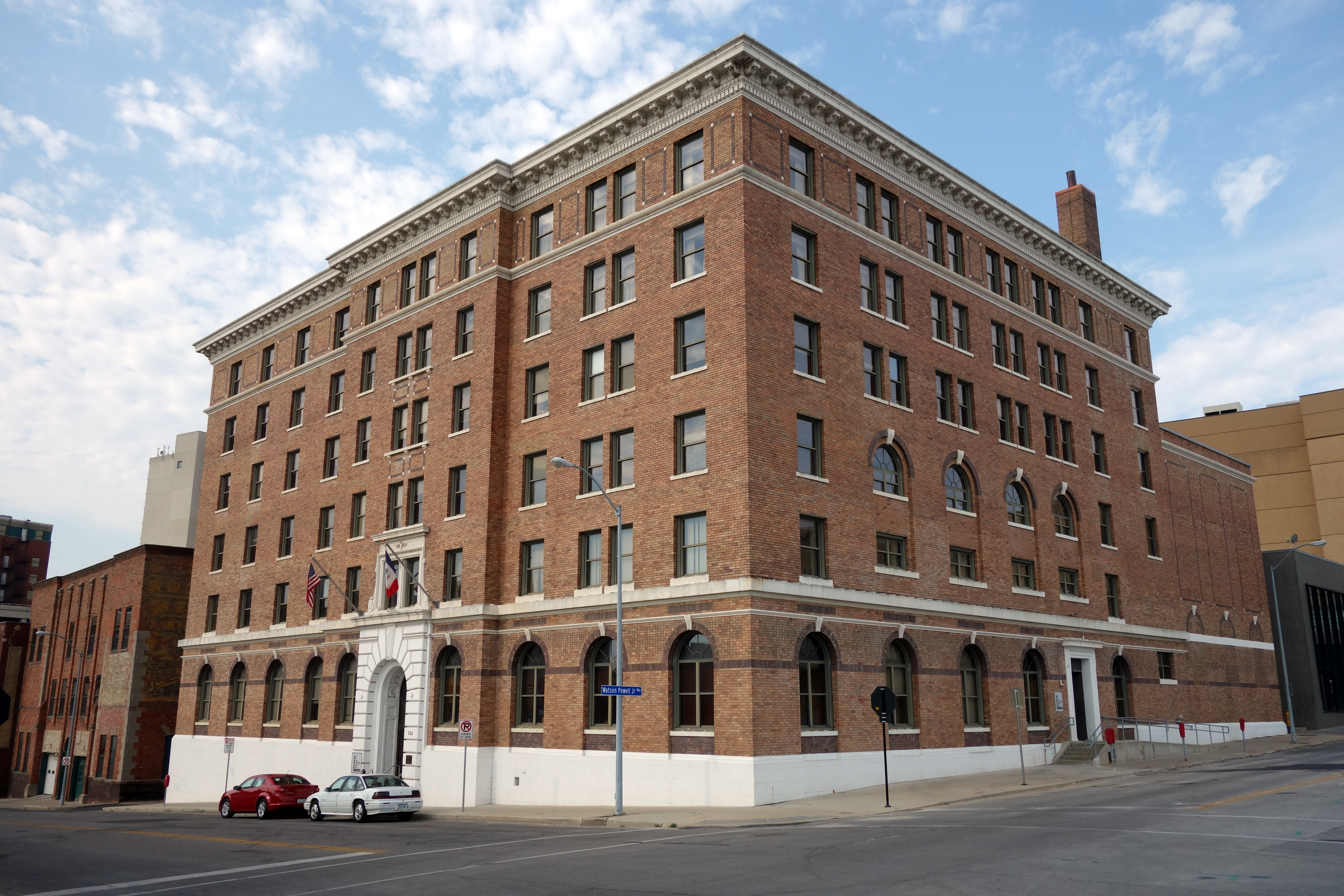
Iowa Commission for the Blind Headquarters in Des Moines

In 1958, Jernigan moved to Iowa to become director of the Iowa Commission for the Blind (now the Iowa Department for the Blind). While there, Jernigan developed and successfully implemented a new model for rehabilitating the blind known as "structured discovery." Eventually, Jernigan's model was utilized by rehabilitation programs around the world.

After Jernigan had been in Iowa for only two weeks, he wrote a detailed letter to Governor Herschel Loveless outlining the deplorable conditions he had found in the agency upon his arrival. He listed countless critical needs of the agency, and then he finished his letter by saying: "The present director should be given a reasonable (but only a reasonable) time in which to show results. If he does not show results, he should be fired. The present director would not be willing that it should be any other way."

In 1968, Jernigan was presented with a citation from President Lyndon Johnson for his outstanding work. Harold Russell of the President's Committee on Employment of the Handicapped visited Des Moines on behalf of the President to present the award. In his speech, Russell said, "If a person must be blind, it is better to be blind in Iowa than in any other place in the nation, or the world!"

Also in 1968, Jernigan became President of the National Federation of the Blind upon the death of founder Jacobus tenBroek. Jernigan briefly stepped down in 1977 for health reasons, but was reelected the following year. He remained in that position until 1986, when he decided to retire and was succeeded by Marc Maurer, who held the position until 2014. After his presidency, Jernigan edited and contributed to over a dozen books of stories about blind people, known as "kernel books," which contain true stories about life experiences of federation members.

Jernigan relocated from Iowa to Baltimore, Maryland in 1978 and became executive director for the American Brotherhood for the Blind (now the American Action Fund for Blind Children and Adults) and Director of the National Center for the Blind. Under his leadership, the Center became the focal point of civil rights activity for the blind. He continued as the political leader of the organization for the rest of his life.

== Death ==
Jernigan died of lung cancer in October 1998. His tombstone in Baltimore bears the legend "He taught us it is respectable to be blind!"
