= Jernigan Institute =

Research and training institute developed and run by the blind

Coordinates: 39°16′8″N 76°36′36″W

The Jernigan Institute is a research and training institute developed and run by the blind. Named after Dr.Kenneth Jernigan, it was the first of its kind. It was established in Baltimore in January 2004. The goal of the institute is to change attitudes about blindness and support the independence of blind individuals.

== Overview ==
The Jernigan Institute is the product of the National Federation of the Blind's campaign to "Change What it Means to be Blind." The campaign's goal was to raise money for an institute focused on research and training on blindness.

The Jernigan institute was officially opened January 30, 2004. Their goal is to understand experiences of blind people and work toward the independence of blind individuals. They work to develop and commercialize assistive technology as determined by people who are blind. The Jernigan Institute provides educational programs, and aims to increase employment opportunities for people who are blind.

Their mission statement is: "The National Federation of the Blind Jernigan Institute leads the quest to understand the real problems of blindness and to develop innovative education, technologies, products, and services that help the world's blind to achieve independence."

== Activities ==
=== Employment and Rehabilitation ===
The primary goal of the institute is to positively impact the employment rate of legally blind adults. One of the programs used to do this is the National Center for Mentoring Excellence. The goal of this program is to affect success of individuals who are blind in their life after high school graduation. Additionally, the institute works to connect people who are blind with networking events, mentorship opportunities, and training to improve their skills to increase the independence of people who are blind.

=== Outreach ===
The Institute provides information on their website and other outreach-type activities to educate society on what it means to be blind, what can blind people do for employment, and what it is like working with a blind person. The outreach activities highlight real experiences of blind people, so as to provide a broad range of examples and experiences.

=== National Center for Blind Youth in Science (NCBYS) ===
The NCBYS is an initiative designed to educate the blind youth of career opportunities in science, technology, engineering, and math (STEM) that are often believed to be impossible for blind people to pursue. They also sponsor innovations in education and technology for the blind.

A few of their projects include:

- NFB Project Innovation – This is essentially an educational summer camp where students, aged 7–11, choose an area of study to focus on and learn more about.
- NFB Youth Slam – This is a week-long program held in locations around the country designed to empower the blind youth of America to pursue an education in Science, Technology, Engineering, and Math (STEM). Many schools around the country do not allow blind students to fully experience these subjects and Youth Slam gives them the opportunity to see that those careers are possible options. Youth Slam also provides other activities promoting independent living of the blind.
- blindscience.org – This is a website designed as a resource for teaching science to the blind youth.

=== Braille ===
The Jernigan Institute promotes literacy among blind people of all ages through the use of Braille. They work to give blind youth a Braille education through programs like NFB Braille Enrichment for Literacy and Learning (BELL), Braille Certification Training Program, and Braille Readers Are Leaders 360 (BRL360). The institute also spreads public awareness of Braille use and works to increase the amount of Braille used in public places across America.

=== Other ===
The Jernigan Institute offers various programs that promote and empower independence among blind people. Such programs provide an education in and promote the use of tools and resources for blind youth, leadership training, and empowerment and resources for parents and teachers of blind children.

== Technology ==
The Jernigan Institute works to increase the quality and amount of nonvisual accessibility on all types of technology that is produced today. A few examples of their efforts include:

- International Braille and Technology Center for the Blind (IBTC) – The IBTC is a technology center that provides evaluations, demonstrations, training, and cost comparisons for speech and Braille technologies.
- The NFB Nonvisual Election Technology Project – This program provides information regarding voter accessibility and the speech output technology that make it possible for blind voters to cast an anonymous ballot.
- NFB Newsline® Service – The Newsline provides nonvisual access through the internet to newspapers, magazines, and other publications.
