= National Federation of the Blind =

American nonprofit organization

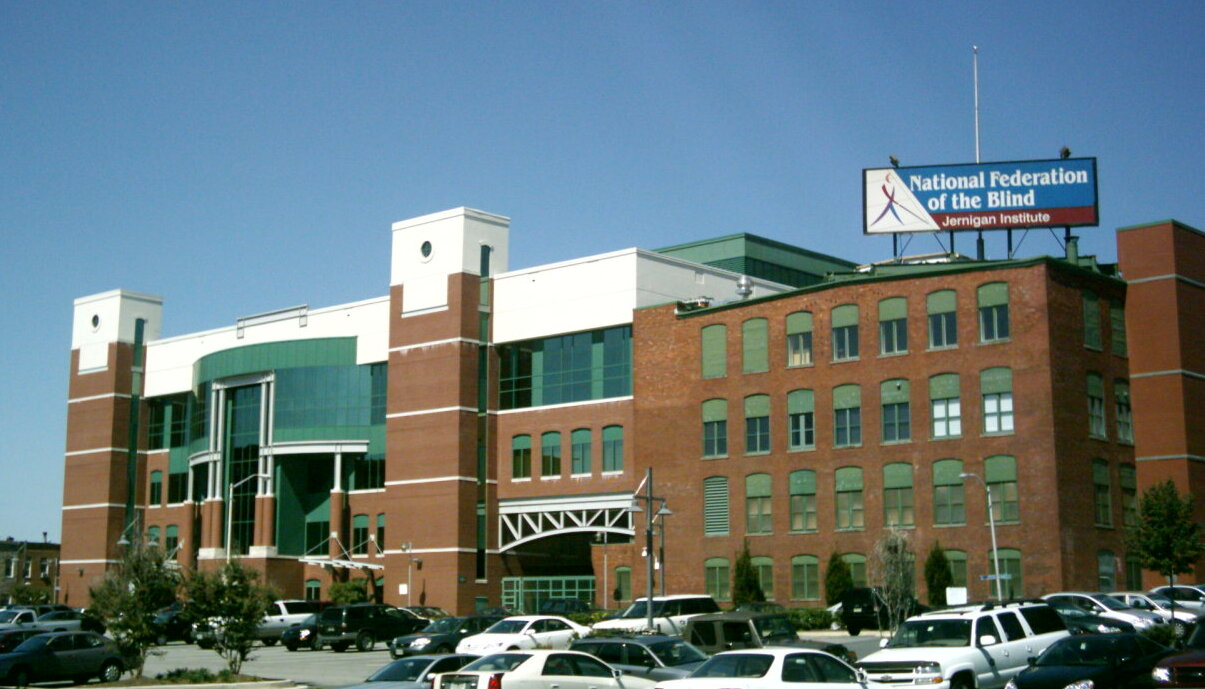
- Formation: November 1940
- Founder: Jacobus tenBroek
- Location: 200 E. Wells Street, Baltimore, Maryland 21230
- President: Mark Riccobono
- First Vice President: Pam Allen
- Second Vice President: Ron Brown
- Secretary: Everette Bacon
- Website: nfb.org

The National Federation of the Blind (NFB) is an American membership and advocacy organization of blind people. Founded in 1940 by Jacobus tenBroek, it became an early force in the organized blind movement and in campaigns for the rights of blind Americans in the mid-20th century. The organization is headquartered in Baltimore, Maryland.

== Overview ==
Anyone, blind or sighted, is permitted to join the NFB, but a majority of members in its local chapters, state affiliates, and nationwide divisions must be blind, as must its officers and board members at every level with exception of the National Organization of Parents of Blind Children. This structure is intended to ensure that the organization is run by blind people and reflects the collective views of its blind members, the NFB refers to itself as "the voice of the nation's blind."

The philosophy of the organization is:

The National Federation of the Blind knows that blindness is not the characteristic that defines you or your future. Every day we raise the expectations of blind people, because low expectations create obstacles between blind people and our dreams. You can live the life you want; blindness is not what holds you back.

The organization's former president, Kenneth Jernigan, said, "We who are blind are pretty much like you. We have our share of both geniuses and jerks, but most of us somewhere between, ordinary people living ordinary lives."

The NFB works to promulgate its philosophy by educating and recruiting new members, working to educate the general public, and interacting with legislators and policy makers at the local, state, and national levels. The positions of the National Federation of the Blind on issues are determined by its national convention, which meets annually and typically has between 2,500 and 3,000 delegates from the organization's affiliates in the fifty states, the District of Columbia, and Puerto Rico.

The policy positions of the NFB take the form of resolutions, which are voted upon by the convention. Like a union, the convention is subsidized by the organization making it affordable to those attending. The agenda of the National Convention is published on-line prior to its convention. Its logo is called the whosit and consists of an outline of a walking person with a white cane.

The NFB-style white cane is longer than most in order to allow the blind person to use a more natural walking position with their arms at their sides, rather than extended in front of them. The added length also allows the blind person to walk more quickly by giving more advanced information. In addition, the lighter weight of the fiberglass and carbon fiber canes, coupled with the metal tip, provides more information than the heavier aluminum style canes with plastic tips. Federation members view the long white cane as a tool of independence and self-determination, rather than one of helplessness and dependency, as it provides greater mobility to the blind.

Though detractors of the National Federation of the Blind assert that the NFB is anti-guide dog, the NFB has a division dedicated to educating the public about the use of guide dogs, while promoting and fostering effective handling of guide dogs by its members. The National Association of Guide Dog Users (NAGDU) is one of the largest and fastest-growing divisions of the Federation.

== Organizational history ==
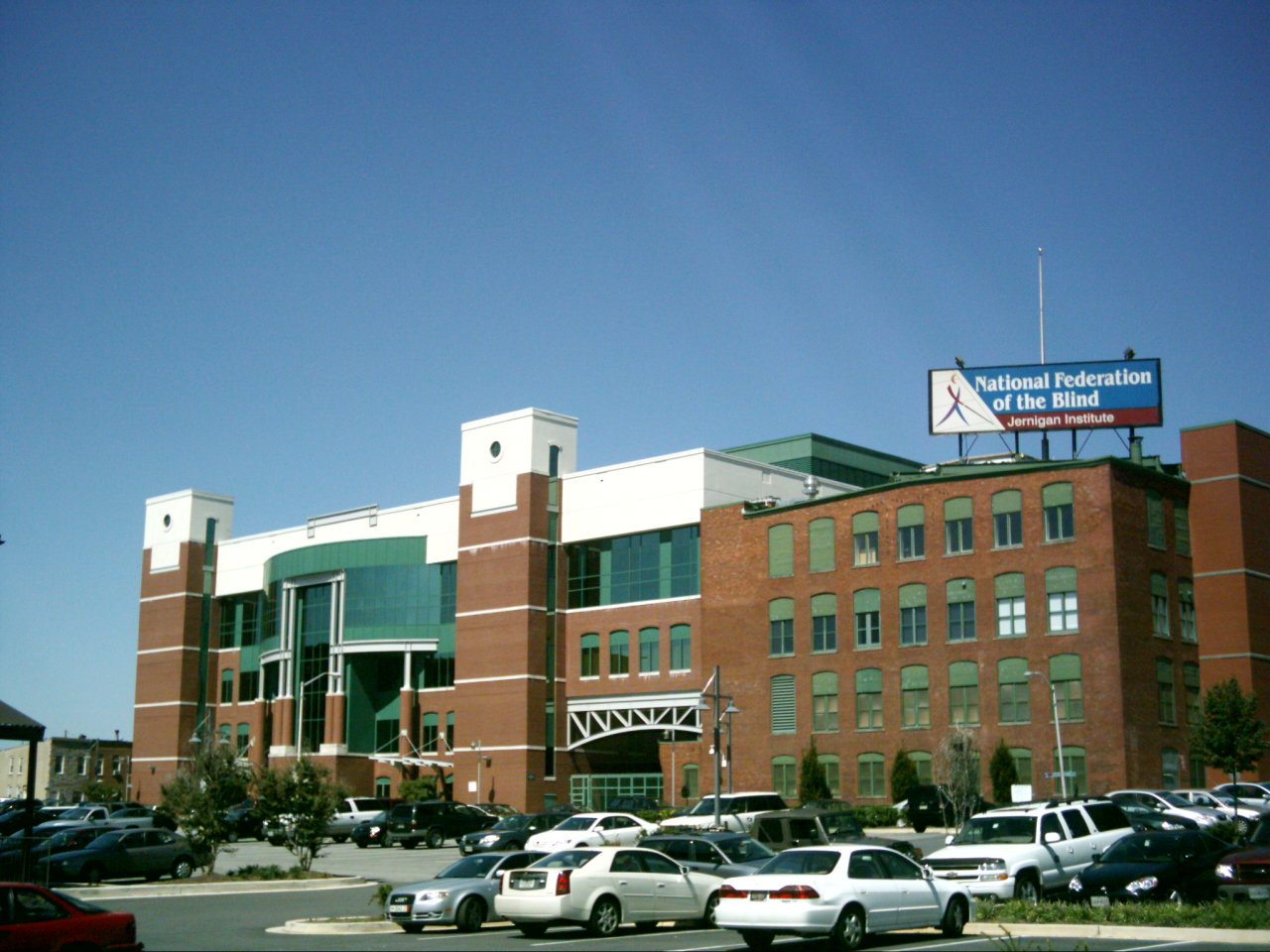
The National Federation of the Blind headquarters and Jernigan Institute in Baltimore, Maryland

In 1940 sixteen people met in Wilkes-Barre, Pennsylvania, to develop a constitution that would unite organizations of blind people in seven states (California, Illinois, Minnesota, Missouri, Ohio, Pennsylvania, and Wisconsin) in a national federation that would serve as a vehicle for collective action to improve the prospects of the nation's blind citizens. Those sixteen people were: Hazel and Jacobus tenBroek of California; Evelyn and Gayle Burlingame of Pennsylvania; David Treatman, Robert Brown, Enoch Kester, Harold Alexander, and Frank Rennard, all of Pennsylvania; Ellis Forshee and Marlo Howell of Missouri; Mary McCann and Ed Collins of Illinois; Emil Arndt of Wisconsin; Frank Hall of Minnesota (accompanied by Lucille deBeer); and Glenn Hoffman of Ohio.

The founder and president of the NFB for its first twenty years was Jacobus tenBroek, a professor, lawyer and constitutional scholar. The NFB's first logo was a circle with the words "Security, Equality, and Opportunity" forming a triangle at the center of the circle. This expressed the pressing needs and demands of the fledgling organization. TenBroek led early battles to obtain a modest stipend for blind people so they could live independently (security), equal access to jobs in the Civil Service and elsewhere where blind candidates had been prohibited from applying (opportunity), and equal access to housing, transportation, and places of public accommodation (equality).

Because of pressure exerted from within and differences of opinion about whether the organization should be a loose confederacy of strong state affiliates or a unified federal structure with state affiliates and local chapters (which is the way the current federation is organized), the NFB split into two groups in 1961. Those who left the NFB united to form the American Council of the Blind, an organization that continues to exist today.

Jacobus tenBroek, who had served as president of the NFB for 20 years, resigned due to these problems, and was succeeded by John Taylor, who was succeeded by Russell Kletzing the following year, but tenBroek became president again in 1966. The NFB gradually replaced the handful of affiliates that had left, and by the 1970s it had regained its momentum. When Jacobus tenBroek died in 1968, he was succeeded in the presidency by Kenneth Jernigan, who served as president for most of the period until 1986 and who continued to be a blind leader, teacher, and thinker with an international reputation until his death in 1998. Marc Maurer, a young lawyer who had been mentored by Jernigan, was elected president in 1986 and served as president until 2014 when he was replaced by Mark Riccobono, who is the current president of the organization.

In 1978 Jernigan led the organization in establishing its national headquarters at 1800 Johnson Street in Baltimore, Maryland. Gradually the group remodeled and occupied the four floors of a block-long building, which they named the National Center for the Blind. The NFB broke ground in October 2001 for a twenty-million-dollar research and training institute now located adjacent to the National Center. The National Federation of the Blind Jernigan Institute opened for business in January 2004.

Continuing to exert its influence, the NFB has taken over Braille Transcriber Certification from the Library of Congress, will receive up to $10 million from a US coin honoring Louis Braille and works to influence state training programs for the blind to require training in the use of the white cane.

== Publications ==
=== Books ===
- In 1999, the NFB published Kenneth Jernigan, The Master, The Mission, The Movement, which tells of the convergence of a master teacher and the organized blind movement-of Dr. Kenneth Jernigan and the National Federation of the Blind.
- In 1990 the NFB published a history of its first fifty years, : A History of the Organized Blind Movement in the United States.
- In the 1990s the group published thirty small compilations of first-person articles written by blind people intended to demonstrate what it is like to be blind known as the Kernel Books. The NFB uses these Kernel Books in its public education efforts.

=== Magazines ===
The organization publishes several magazines.

- Since 1957 it has produced a monthly general-interest magazine called the Braille Monitor.
- Future Reflections is a quarterly magazine produced by the National Organization of Parents of Blind Children for parents and teachers. Future Reflections was established in 1981, and issues beginning in 1991 are available on the NFB's web site.
- From 1998 through 2007 the National Association of Blind Students published the Student Slate, discussing topics relating to blindness and higher education.
- Since one of the most frequent ramifications of diabetes is vision loss, the NFB publishes a quarterly tabloid-format magazine called Voice of the Diabetic.

== Membership, governing structure and subsidiary organizations ==
The NFB's literature estimates about 50,000 active members. Membership is open to all, both blind and sighted. All officers of the organization and its affiliates must be blind, except for the leaders of the National Organization of Parents of Blind Children.

The NFB has affiliates in all 50 states as well as the District of Columbia and Puerto Rico, and these affiliates are divided into local chapters. Affiliates and chapters pledge to support the national organization while carrying on independent activities in their local areas. The affiliates, chapters and the national organization periodically have elections for officers. The positions are president, first vice president, second vice president, secretary, treasurer and several board members.

The NFB also has dozens of groups for people with special interests, such as the National Association of Blind Students, the National Association of Blind Lawyers, The National Association of Blind Merchants, the National Association of the Blind in Communities of Faith, and the National Association of Guide Dog Users, to name some of the larger groups. Some of these groups, such as the National Association of Guide Dog Users and National Association of Blind Students, also have state affiliates.

Since 1945, the NFB has held a convention every year in a major American city, usually early in July. As of 2005, it is estimated that between 2,000 and 3,000 people attend these conventions. In 2002, 2003 and 2005 the convention was held at the Galt House Hotel in Louisville, Kentucky, but it is unusual for the conventions to be held so often in a particular city. The 2006 convention was held in Dallas, Texas, and the 2007 convention was held in Atlanta, Georgia. At the 2007 convention, on the morning of July 3, over 1000 NFB members marched two miles from the Marriott Marquis Hotel to the Olympic Park in what was known as the March for Independence. It was led by Congressman John Lewis. The March for Independence was held again the following year in Dallas. Money raised from the march went to the Imagination fund, which will support NFB programs and grants.

Each state has its own affiliate convention sometime during the year. At the national convention, which lasts a week, there are presentations about the struggles and triumphs of blind people, and the availability of technology for blind people has been a common topic.

The special interest groups have meetings at the convention during which they elect their officers, and the president gives his presidential report. The presidential report describes the actions taken by the national headquarters during the last year. The president also gives a speech at the banquet, in which he takes a more philosophical approach focusing on the nature of blindness as a characteristic.

The national convention has elections for officers and board members, in which the selections of the nominating committee have been elected unanimously in recent years, and the convention passes resolutions about the policies of the organization, which often provokes some debate. The state conventions, which usually last two to three days, also have resolutions and elections, which are often more contentious than at the national level.

== Scholarships ==
The NFB awards scholarships to 30 blind college students each year in recognition of achievement by blind scholars.

== Rehabilitation ==
NFB provides blindness training at sites in the United States which require a residency of about 12 to 14 months. Spouses and children of the blind are not permitted to live with the blind student during this time of intense training. Family involvement in rehabilitation is limited and discouraged.

The NFB has developed and requires the students in its rehabilitation programs to use only their own line of lightweight long white non-folding canes. The purported purpose is to enhance effective travel coupled with the use of dark sleep shades for total occlusion during the intense year long training schedule. The object of simulating total blindness according to various articles and opinions published in the Braille Monitor (an NFB Publication) is to prepare the student for such a time when they might become totally blind. Some medical professionals hold the opinion that such total occlusion practice actually exacerbates the deterioration of sight in those who might still have a remainder of limited or partial sight.

The NFB has always stressed that the blind citizen is to be taught to travel not simply by memorizing specific routes, but by practicing going to unfamiliar places using the long cane and even wearing blindfolds, called sleep shades, if they have any residual vision. The NFB contends that students who have been trained using this method become confident, independent travelers who do not need to return for more training if they lose more sight. Though the NFB supports the use of guide dogs (and some of its members use them) the NFB believes that all blind people should know how to use canes and in practice strongly discourages the use of guide dogs as a sign of weakness and a lack of independence in the user of this tool.

The NFB advocates teaching braille to both children and adults who cannot read print efficiently and comfortably. This position has provoked opposition from some agencies and school districts who believe that only children who are totally or almost totally blind should need to learn braille. According to the National Center for Health Statistics National Health Interview Survey, the United States has 94,000 legally blind school-age children. Of these only about 5,500 are being taught braille. Some of these students can read print effectively; some are multiply impaired and cannot learn to read at all; but the NFB believes that many more than the six percent of the blind children currently learning to read braille could be taught to read if parents and educators were committed to doing so. An even smaller percentage of adults losing vision are encouraged to learn braille. The NFB maintains that these adults are functionally illiterate when they are no longer able to read print effectively and braille instruction has not been made available to them. Some graduates of NFB rehabilitation programs report that after losing their sight in mid-life they were discouraged by those who never experienced sight not to continue visualizing their surroundings or loved ones despite medical opinions to the contrary.

In the mid-1980s the NFB established three adult training centers: the Louisiana Center for the Blind (Ruston, Louisiana) the Colorado Center for the Blind (Littleton, Colorado), and Blindness Learning in New Dimensions (BLIND), Inc., (Minneapolis, Minnesota). These facilities have now trained hundreds of blind adults to travel, read Braille, use computers with screen-access programs, cook, and use power tools. These centers also have summer programs for teenagers. The training centers are largely staffed by blind people.

== Technology ==
In 1977 the NFB directed the final field trials of the first reading machine, developed by noted inventor and futurist Ray Kurzweil. The machine weighed 80 pounds and cost $50,000. The machine used 50 bits per word and could store 750,000 bits of information. It used a camera to scan 15 characters per second and was programmed with the rules that govern spoken English. From this it produced the word with a synthetic voice.

NFB has partnered with Kurzweil Educational Systems, a company founded by Ray Kurzweil, to develop a completely portable reading machine: the Kurzweil-National Federation of the Blind Reader. A digital camera takes a picture of the printed material to be read, and an attached personal digital assistant (PDA) reads the text aloud. The text is also stored as a text file, which can be saved and moved to a computer or portable notetaker so that it can be sent to a braille embosser (sometimes called a braille printer) or read on a paperless braille display.

== Outside the United States ==
The NFB is a participant in the World Blind Union and maintains relationships with groups of blind people in other countries. In the UK, there is a similar organization known as the National Federation of the Blind of the United Kingdom.

== See also ==
- National Federation of the Blind v. Target Corporation – Court case involving the NFB and technology
- American Council of the Blind Rival organization
- American Foundation for the Blind – formerly a rival organization controlled by agencies that were against the NFB
- Randolph-Sheppard Act – important legislation for blind vendors.
- Abraham Nemeth – prominent mathematician who was an active member.
