= Rudolf Wolf =

Swiss astronomer and mathematician (1816–1893)

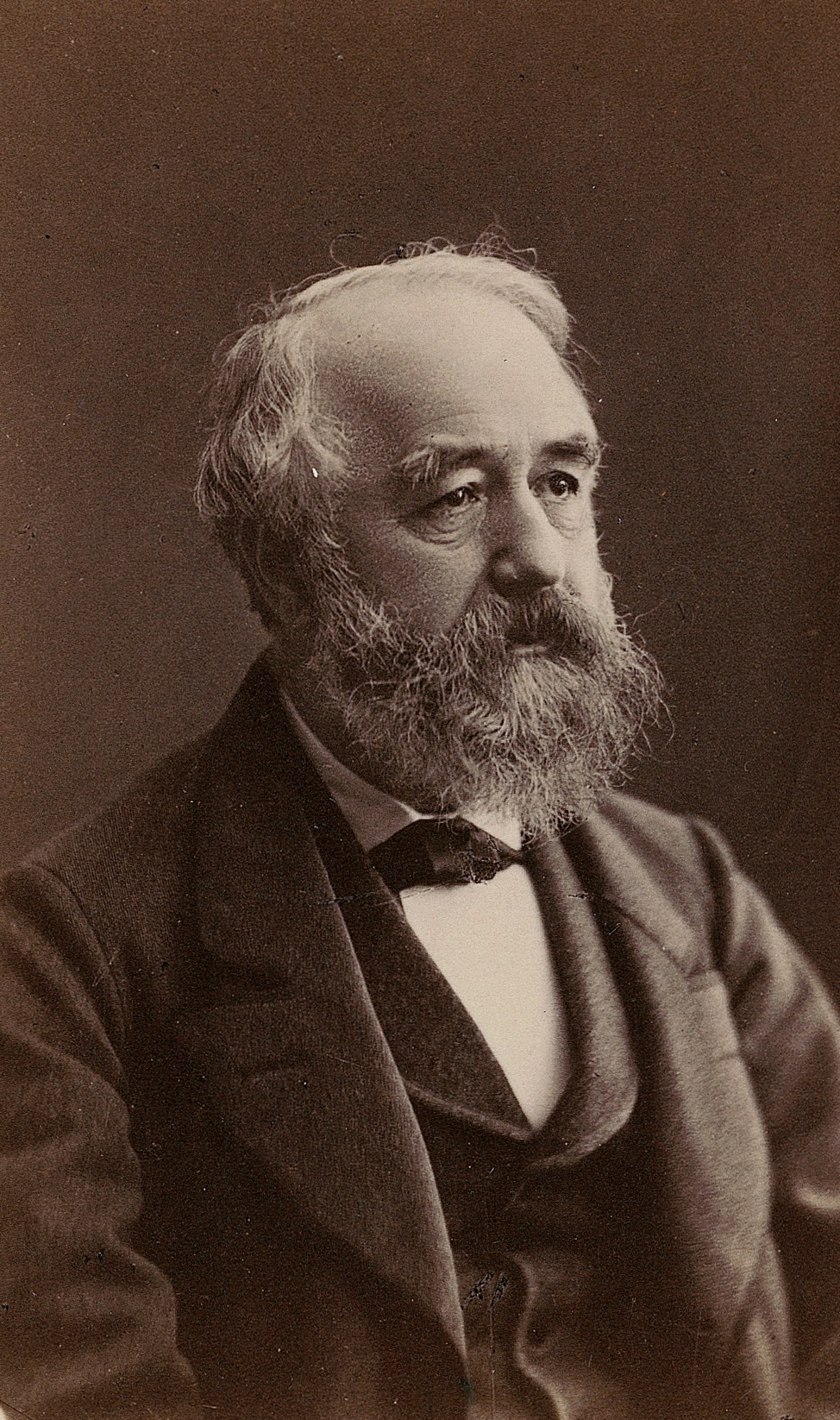
- Rudolf Wolf
- Born: 7 July 1816; Fällanden
- Died: 6 December 1893 (aged 77)
- Education: University of Zurich
- Known for: Solar cycle 1 Wolf number
- Scientific career
- Fields: Astronomy
- Workplaces: University of Zurich
- Doctoral advisor: Encke

Johann Rudolf Wolf (7 July 1816 – 6 December 1893) was a Swiss astronomer and mathematician best known for his research on sunspots.

Wolf was born in Fällanden, near Zurich. He studied at the universities of Zurich, Vienna, and Berlin. Encke was one of his teachers. Wolf became professor of astronomy at the University of Bern in 1844 and director of the Bern Observatory in 1847. In 1855 he accepted a chair of astronomy at both the University of Zurich and the Federal Institute of Technology in Zurich.

Wolf was greatly impressed by the discovery of the sunspot cycle by Heinrich Schwabe and he not only carried out his own observations, but he collected all the available data on sunspot activity back as far as 1610 and calculated a period for the cycle of 11.1 years. In 1848 he devised a way of quantifying sunspot activity. The Wolf number, as it is now called, remains in use. In 1852 Wolf was one of four people who discovered the link between the cycle and geomagnetic activity on Earth.

Around 1850, to study the laws of probability, Wolf performed a Buffon's needle experiment, dropping a needle on a plate 5000 times to verify the value of π, a precursor to the Monte Carlo method.

In 1861, he presided the Swiss Geodetic Commission a commission of the Swiss Academy of Natural Sciences. This commission was created during the publication of the Dufour map, and its initial work contributed to the design of the Topographic Atlas of Switzerland. In 1861, Johan Jacob Baeyer proposed the creation of the Central European Arc Measurement, whose objective was to redetermine anomalies in the shape of the Earth using precise geodetic surveys combined with gravimetry. The aim was to figure out the geoid using gravimetric and leveling measurements to derive an accurate understanding of the Earth ellipsoid while taking vertical deflections into account.
