= John Maurer (jazz musician) =

American musician

John Maurer is a jazz musician. His trumpet and flugelhorn performances have earned critical acclaim. His rendition of "The Star-Spangled Banner", in particular, has been recognized across the US. He was an artist-in-residence at Misericordia University, is on faculty at Marywood University, and teaches at several conservatories and performing arts centers. His album, Songs for My Son, was released in 2018.
