= Dalton Minimum =

Period of low solar activity from 1790 to 1830

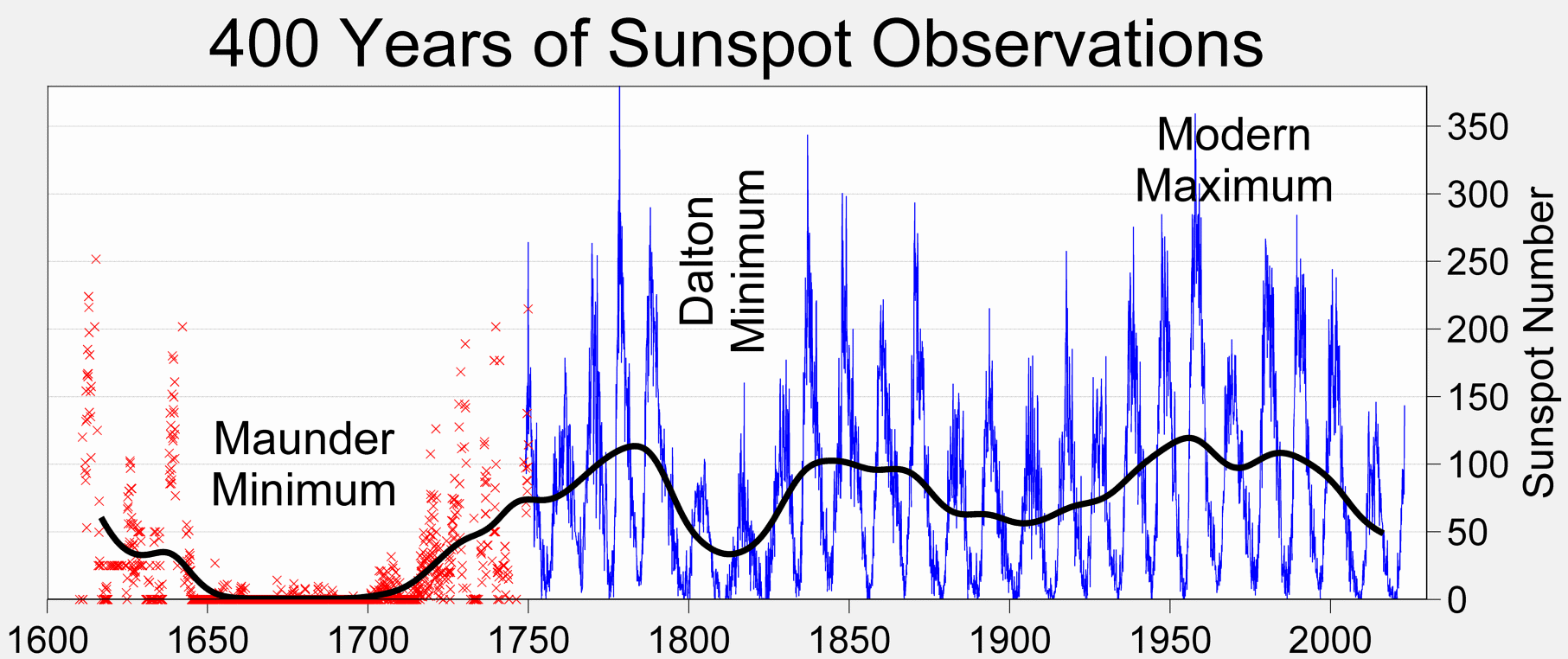
The Dalton minimum in the 400-year history of sunspot numbers

The Dalton Minimum was a period of low sunspot count, representing low solar activity, named after the English meteorologist John Dalton, lasting from about 1790 to 1830 or 1796 to 1820, corresponding to the period solar cycle 4 to solar cycle 7. While the Dalton Minimum is often compared with the Maunder Minimum, its sunspot number was slightly higher and reported sunspots distributed in both solar hemispheres unlike the Maunder Minimum. The coronal streamers are visually confirmed in Ezra Ames and José Joaquin de Ferrer’s eclipse drawings in 1806 and indicates similarity of its magnetic field not with that of the Maunder Minimum but with that of the modern solar cycles.

== Temperature ==
Like the Maunder Minimum and Spörer Minimum, the Dalton Minimum coincided with a period of lower-than-average global temperatures. During that period, there was a variation of temperature of about 1 °C in Germany.

The cause of the lower-than-average temperatures and their possible relation to the low sunspot count are not well understood. Recent papers have suggested that a rise in volcanism was largely responsible for the cooling trend.

While the Year Without a Summer, in 1816, occurred during the Dalton Minimum, the prime reason for that year's cool temperatures was the highly explosive eruption the previous year of Mount Tambora in Indonesia, which was one of the two largest eruptions in the past 2000 years. One must also consider that the rise in volcanism may have been triggered by lower levels of solar output as there is a weak but statistically significant link between decreased solar output and an increase in volcanism.

== See also ==
- Solar cycle
