= Heinrich Schwabe =

German astronomer (1789–1875)

Samuel Heinrich Schwabe
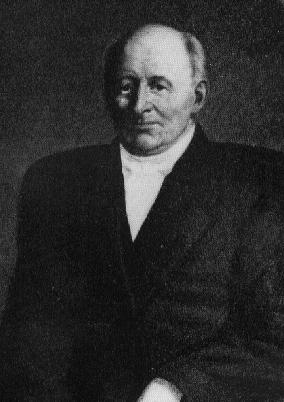
- Born: 25 October 1789; Dessau, Anhalt-Dessau, Holy Roman Empire
- Died: 11 April 1875 (aged 85); Dessau, Duchy of Anhalt, German Empire
- Known for: sunspots
- Awards: Gold Medal of the Royal Astronomical Society (1857)
- Scientific career
- Fields: astronomy

Samuel Heinrich Schwabe (25 October 1789 – 11 April 1875) was a German amateur astronomer remembered for his work on sunspots. He observed sunspots and made drawings of them from 1825 to 1867 and suggested in 1838 that there may be a ten-year cycle of sunspot activity. He also took an interest in botany and was a founding member of a natural history society in Dessau.

== Life and work ==
Schwabe was born in Dessau, Germany, where his father was a physician to the duke. His mother was the daughter of apothecary Johann H. G. Häseler (1740-1812) and he too trained to be one in 1806 by joining the Dessau Mohrenapotheke owned by Häseler. After about three years he began to study at the University of Berlin training in pharmacy under Martin Heinrich Klaproth and Sigismund Friedrich Hermbstädt. He also took an interest in astronomy and botany and was forced to stop studies when his grandfather Häseler fell ill. After the death of Häseler in 1812, Schwabe was forced to take over the family pharmacy business and the family became prosperous. He spent his spare time in scientific pursuits but it was only after selling off the business that he began to attend to scientific activities fulltime.

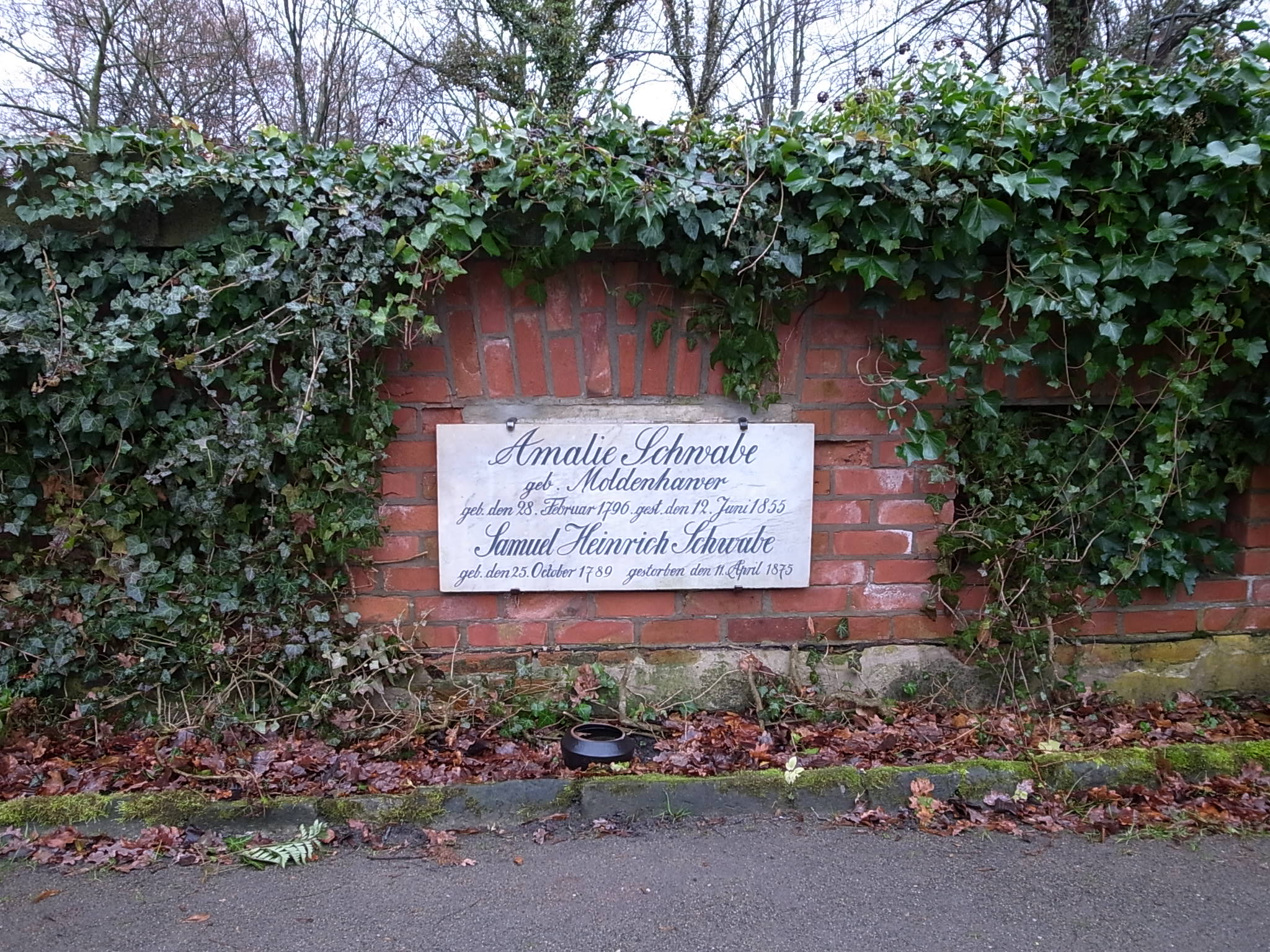
Grave stone in Dessau

Schwabe obtained his first telescope through a lottery in 1825 and began his observations on sunspots from 30 October 1825. In 1826 he obtained a better telescope, a 4.8-in. Fraunhofer refractor that was used by Wilhelm Lohrmann to map the Moon. From 1829 he was completely involved in scientific work. Schwabe was looking for a theoretical planet inside the orbit of Mercury, known as Vulcan. Because of the proximity to the Sun, it would have been very difficult to observe such a planet, and Schwabe believed one possibility to detect a new planet might be to see it during its transit in front of the Sun. For 17 years, from 1826 to 1843, on every clear day, Schwabe would scan the Sun and record its spots trying to detect any new planet among them. He kept notes but was not interested in publishing his results. His first note was a letter to Heinrich Schumacher which was published in Astronomical Nachrichten (no. 495). Although he did not find any planet transiting the solar disc he noticed the regular variation in the number of sunspots and published his findings in a short article entitled "Solar Observations during 1843". In it he made the suggestion of a probable ten-year period (i.e. that at every tenth year the number of spots reached a maximum). This paper at first attracted little attention, but Rudolf Wolf who was at that time the director of Bern observatory, was impressed so he began regular observations of sunspots. Schwabe's observations were afterwards utilized in 1850 by Alexander von Humboldt in the third volume of his Kosmos. The periodicity of sunspots is now fully recognized; and to Schwabe is thus due the credit of one of the most important discoveries in astronomy. Data from his notes and 8486 drawings has been digitized and analyzed. They have helped fill in gaps in the data collected by Rudolf Wolf from 1848. Schwabe also made observations of the Great Red Spot of Jupiter and made notes of it in 1831 although these were only noticed and published in 1899.

Schwabe was involved in founding a natural history society in Dessau where he served as its president. He contributed many mineral specimens to the collections of the society. In 1838 and 1839 he published his notes on botany in two volumes under the title Flora Anhaltina, describing nearly 2000 plant species.

In 1857 Schwabe was awarded the Gold Medal of the Royal Astronomical Society. The medal was presented by Richard Carrington in Dessau and the honor influenced Schwabe to bequeath his notes to the Royal Astronomical Society which elected him as a member in 1868.
