= Medieval maximum =

Medieval Solar Maximum event from 1100-1250s

Solar activity events recorded in radiocarbon. Values since 1950 not shown.

The Medieval maximum is a solar maximum event that occurred between the years 1100–1250, which also corresponded with the Medieval Warm Period. Paleoclimate studies identified this period through the usage of surviving dendrochronological records as well as radiocarbon dating in addition to other isotopes such as Beryllium-10 to measure cosmogenic isotope production by solar rays. This correspondence of the solar activity during this activity presented the trend of increased agricultural activity in Europe, expanded urbanization, and warmer sea temperatures in Japan, and with it, solar phenomena has been documented through the contemporary records in China, Japan, and Goryeo Korea.

== Solar phenomena observations ==
Solar activity events and approximate dates
Event	Start	End
Homeric minimum	800 BC	600 BC
Oort minimum	1010	1050
Oort minimum	1040	1080
Medieval maximum	1100	1250
Wolf minimum	1280	1350
Spörer minimum	1460	1550
Maunder minimum	1645	1715
Dalton minimum	1790	1830
Modern maximum	1950	2009

Observations of solar activity, prominently auroras are prominent when charged particles from the Sun reach Earth and interact with the magnetic field, generating light. In periods of high solar activity, those auroras can reach down to the low latitudes of Japan and Southern China. Such unusual solar activity were observed by contemporary historians at the time and in many instances during the first millennia, many such instances were documented in as part of the annals of China's Twenty-Four Histories, with the oldest references to phenomena going as far back as the 10th century BC in the Bamboo Annals.

During the medieval period, physical descriptors of the solar activity were frequently described in Old History of the Five Dynasties (舊五代史) as well as the Book of Song.

On 14 Feb. 937, at night, red and white vapors appeared alternately, like a cultivated and exploited bamboo forest, from 23:00 to 3:00, muddily from north to the middle in the sky, flickering unstably went around the 28 lunar mansions and disappeared at the dawn. - Old History of the Five Dynasties

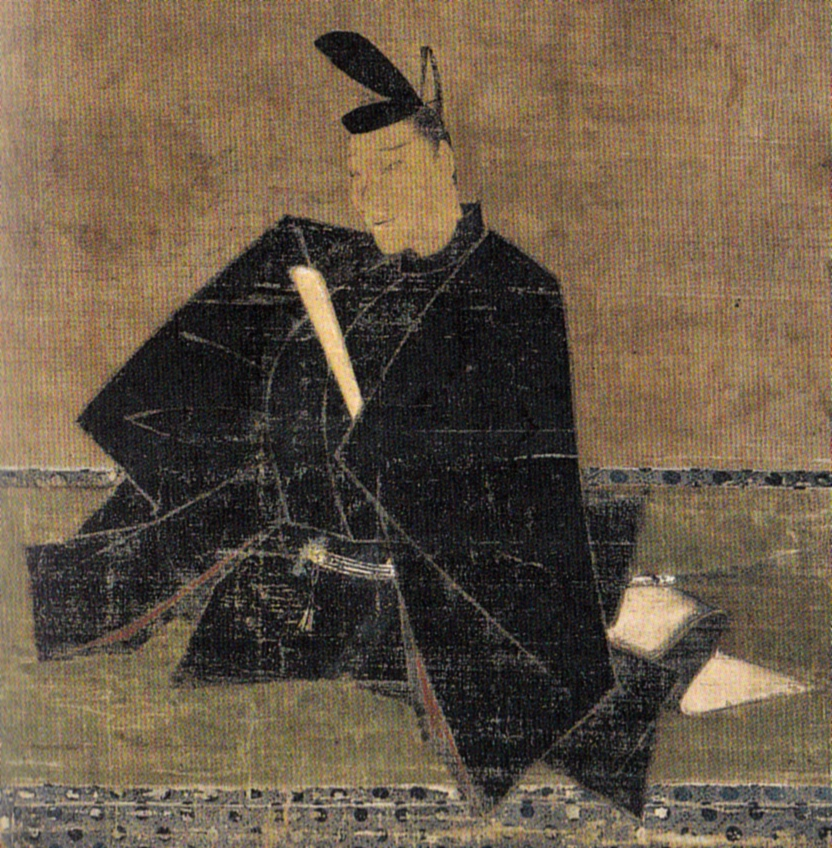
Fujiwara no Teika

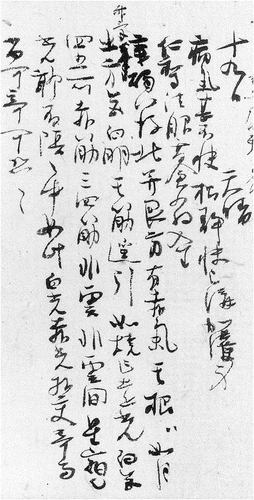
Meigetsuki – 21 February 1204 aurora event

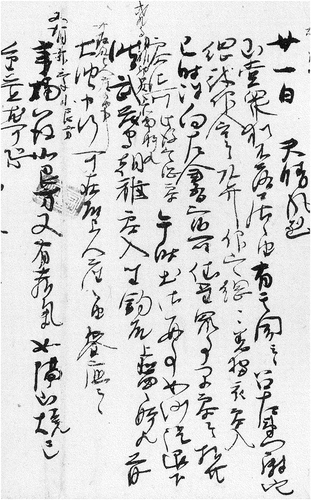
Meigetsuki – 23 February 1204 aurora event

One of the most prominent solar maximum activity documented in Japan, was during the Kamakura period in 21–24 February 1204 with multiple sightings in Kyoto. Two prominent observers include the poet Fujiwara no Teika, who recorded the activity in his diary the Meigetsuki and the author of the historical chronicle, the Omuro Soshoki (now housed in Ninna-ji and is a National Treasure).

On 1204/02/21, it was sunny. … After sunset, red vapor appeared in the direction of north and north-east. The lower part of red vapor was shaped like a rising moon and colored white and bright. Its stripes extended faraway and was like smokes in fires. There were four or five of white parts and three or four of red vapors appeared. Is it neither cloud nor stands within clouds? Its light did not get darken and red light is mixed in the white light. It is nothing but a mystery. It is also very dreadful. On 1204/02/23, it was sunny and quite windy. … In the time when to put a fire on the lamp, red vapor appeared in the north and north-east. It was like a distant mountain burning. It was very dreadful. - Meigetuski

On 1204/02/21, at 20:00, red vapor appeared with white cloud mixed and was seen from north-west to north-east. On 1204/02/22 as well. On 1204/02/23, as well. Takashige stated that these were very rare disaster. We put off the pilgrimage to Koyasan. - Omuro Soshoki

In the Book of Song, 21 February 1204 aurora activity also coincided with visible descriptions of the sun itself, describing a "black spot as big as a jujube".

As the oldest extreme space weather ever documented in those three days, it can be inferred that the frequency of activity in East Asia was attributed towards the geomagnetic pole's lean to the region, and the strength of the storms were accompanied by medieval French and German chronicles at the time.

== Radiocarbon dating ==
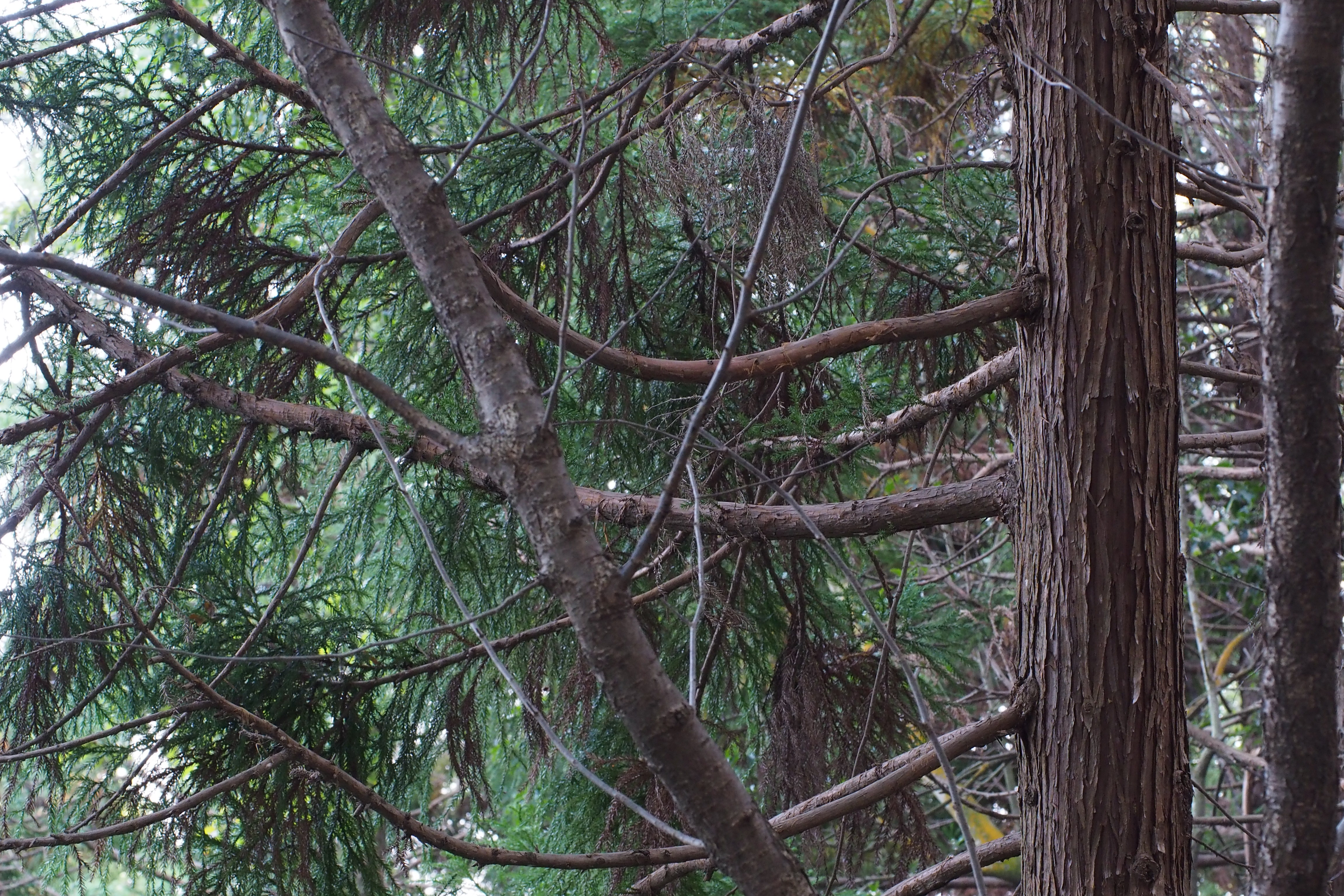
Cryptomeria tree

Cosmic Radiation often leads to a giant spike of Carbon-14 within the dendrochronological records and has been recorded in large doses within wood samples dating to the 8th century, which could be detected with accelerated mass spectrometry, though the corresponding 13th century records could not be detected in that matter.

The study of the Meigetsuki was cross-matched with the analysis of Cryptomeria japonica (asunaro) trees excavated from Shimokita Peninsula, Aomori Prefecture, where each tree-ring was separated with the cellulose extracted and converted into graphite to allow for the actual breakdown of carbon-14 levels throughout the 13th century.

It was determined that although the levels of carbon-14 were not particularly high when Fujiwara no Teika recorded his observations, it was a few years prior in 1200–1201 that a solar proton event registered with the trees and that it was 14-times larger than the landmark 20th century solar storm of 23 February 1956.

Additional solar flare activity within the asunaro tree-rings detected spikes of radiation in 1261/1262, 1268/1269, and 1279/1280, each spike weakening and eventually giving way to the Wolf minimum.
