= Joseph Hilbe =

American statistician (1944–2017)

- Born: December 30, 1944; Los Angeles, California, USA
- Died: March 12, 2017 (aged 72); Arizona, USA
- Education: California State University, Chico; University of Hawaiʻi; UCLA
- Known for: negative binomial regression logistic regression astrostatistics
- Awards: Fellow, American Statistical Association; Elected Member, International Statistical Institute (ISI)
- Scientific career
- Fields: statistician and mathematician
- Workplaces: University of Hawaiʻi; Arizona State University; Jet Propulsion Laboratory

Notes
- President, International Astrostatistics Association (2012–2017)

Joseph Michael Hilbe (December 30, 1944 – March 12, 2017) was an American statistician and philosopher, founding President of the International Astrostatistics Association (IAA) and one of the most prolific authors of books on statistical modeling in the early twenty-first century. Hilbe was an elected Fellow of the American Statistical Association as well as an elected member of the International Statistical Institute (ISI), for which he founded the ISI astrostatistics committee in 2009. Hilbe was also a Fellow of the Royal Statistical Society and Full Member of the American Astronomical Society.

Hilbe made a number of contributions to the fields of count response models and logistic regression. Among his most influential books are two editions of Negative Binomial Regression (Cambridge University Press, 2007, 2011), Modeling Count Data (Cambridge University Press, 2014), and Logistic Regression Models (Chapman & Hall/CRC, 2009). Modeling Count Data won the 2015 PROSE honorable mention award for books in mathematics as the second best mathematics book published in 2014. Hilbe was also editor-in-chief of the Springer Series in Astrostatistics, which began in 2011, was one of two co-editors for the Astrostatistics and AstroInformatics Portal, a co-ordinated website for the major astrostatistical organizations worldwide, hosted by the Pennsylvania State University Department of Astronomy and Astrophysics, and was coordinating editor of the Cambridge University Press Series on Predictive Analytics in Action, which commenced in 2012. A listing of his books, book chapters and encyclopedia articles are listed below (Publications).

Hilbe was also a two-time national champion track & field athlete, a US team and NCAA Division 1 head coach, and Olympic Games official. He was also chair of the ISI sports statistics committee from 2007 to 2011 and chair of the 2014 Section on Statistics and Sports of the American Statistical Association.

== Life and works ==
Born in Los Angeles, California, son of Rader John Hilbe (1910–1980) and Nadyne Anderson Hilbe (1910–1988), Hilbe was raised in Arcadia, California, attended three years of high school at Woodside Priory School in Portola Valley, California, before graduating from Paradise, California high school in 1962. Hilbe attended California State University, Chico, from which he graduated in 1968 with a degree in philosophy. Hilbe studied for his doctorate in philosophy at the University of California, Los Angeles (UCLA) where he was a graduate reader for visiting professor and Nobel Laureate Friedrich Hayek and personal assistant to Rudolf Carnap, one of the founders of the Vienna Circle of Logical Positivism.

Hilbe secured a position at the University of Hawaiʻi, where he retired as an emeritus professor of philosophy in 1990. During this time he authored several texts in philosophy and logic. In 1988 he earned a doctorate in statistics (applied mathematics, UCLA) and in 1990 was hired by the Health Care Financing Administration to develop statistical and data management tools for the study of Medicare data. Hilbe served as the founding editor of the Stata Technical Bulletin (predecessor to the Stata Journal) from 1991 to 1993, for which he developed a variety of statistical software commands, including the first generalized linear model (GLM) program having a negative binomial regression family (1993). The negative binomial family is now incorporated into the GLM routines of all major commercial statistical software. Hilbe is regarded as having popularized negative binomial regression, particularly in the disciplines of biostatistics and health outcomes analysis. It is now a standard method used for modeling overdispersed count data. Hilbe's 2007 text, Negative Binomial Regression, was the first text specifically devoted to the model and its many variations. His 2014 Modeling Count Data is regarded as the first text on applied count models.

In 1992 Hilbe was appointed as an adjunct professor of Statistics in the Department of Sociology at Arizona State University, Tempe, Arizona. In 2007 the Sociology department merged with several other departments to become the School of Social and Family Dynamics. Hilbe served in several corporate positions during the 1990s, including the positions of lead statistician for Genentech's National Registry for Myocardial Infarctions (NRMI-2;1996–97) and lead statistician for Hoffman-La Roche's Canadian National Registry for Cardiovascular Disease (FASTRAK;1997–99). During this period Hilbe played an important role in the formation of the Health Policy Statistics Section of the American Statistical Association, serving as a member of its initial executive committee and as a member of the founding scientific organizing committee (1995) for the International Conferences on Health Policy Statistics (ICHPS). Hilbe was also one of the longest-serving editors for a publication of the American Statistical Association, holding the position of Software Reviews Editor for The American Statistician for twelve years from 1997 to 2009.

Hilbe's long-term interest in astronomy and meteorites led to his selection in 2006 as a Solar System Ambassador with NASA / Jet Propulsion Laboratory, California Institute of Technology in Pasadena, California commencing January 2007. In 2008 Hilbe initiated the International Statistical Institute's (ISI) Astrostatistics Interest Group. In December 2009, the ISI Council approved the creation of an astrostatistics committee and network with Hilbe as inaugural chair. It was the first such interest-working group or committee authorized under the auspices of an astronomical or statistical organization. In August 2012 the International Astrostatistics Association (IAA) was formed, with Hilbe elected as its founding President. The IAA is the first worldwide professional association for astrostatisticians. Its goal is to enhance collaboration between astrophysists, statisticians, and computer-information scientists, with an aim of enabling researchers to better understand and interpret astronomical data. In 2012, the Network and IAA stimulated the creation of the first working groups in astrostatistics and astroinformations within both the American Astronomical Society (AAS) and International Astronomical Union (IAU), with Hilbe as an initial member in both. Hilbe was also on the scientific organizing committee of the first IAU symposium on astrostatistics, Statistical Challenges in 21st Century Cosmology, held in May 2013 in Lisbon.

In 2009 Hilbe received the Distinguished Alumnus award from California State University, Chico. Two years prior, he had been inducted into the Chico State Athletic Hall of Fame. He is the only graduate of the university to receive both awards. In 2010, Hilbe was inducted into the Paradise High School Athletic Hall of Fame, and in 2011 was inducted into the Woodside Priory High School Athletic Hall of Fame. Hilbe was married to Cheryl Swisher (1984) in Honolulu, Hawaii, and has four children.

== Athletics ==
Known as Joe Hilbe when involved with athletics, Hilbe won the National Amateur Athletic Union (AAU) pentathlon championships in 1968 and 1978. He was also listed in the Track & Field News World List rankings in the 100 yards (9.4, 1967) and 400 meters (45.9, 1965). Hilbe set Hawaii state records for javelin (78.51/257'7", 1976), which is still the recognized state mark. Hilbe served as national chair for AAU girl's Junior Olympic track & field from 1979 to 1982, and was head women's track & field coach at the University of Hawaii from 1979 to 1985. His foremost athletes were Gwen Loud, 1984 NCAA Division 1 long jump champion (6.72/22'5¾") and a member of the U.S. team to the first International Association of Athletics Federations (IAAF) world championships in Helsinki, 1983, and Gwen Gardner, second at the 1980 U.S. Olympic Trials 400 meters, earning a berth on the Olympic team that boycotted the Moscow Olympic Games. As a men's assistant coach at the University of Hawaii (1973–1977), Hilbe coached Terry Albritton, who broke the shot put world record (21.85/71'8½") in 1976, and won numerous AAU and NCAA titles. Hilbe was elected to serve as a U.S. team coach and manager during the 1980s for several major competitions in the U.S., Australia/New Zealand, the Caribbean, and in Europe.

Hilbe was a member of the founding committee that formed the National Track & Field Officials Association in 1977. He was a lead competition official and IAAF technical official at the 1984 Los Angeles Olympic Games and was hired by Turner Broadcasting System to serve as athletics broadcast coordinator for the 1990 Goodwill Games held in Seattle, Washington.

== Publications: Books ==
- Hilbe, Joseph M., de Souza, Rafael S., Ishida, Emille E. O. Bayesian Models for Astrophysical Data: Using R, JAGS, Python, and Stan, Cambridge University Press (2017) ISBN 978-1-1071-3308-2
- Hilbe, Joseph M., Practical Guide to Logistic Regression, Chapman & Hall/CRC (2015) ISBN 978-1-4987-0957-6
- Miner, L.A., P.S. Bolding, J.M. Hilbe, et al., Practical Predictive Analytics and Decisioning Systems in Medicine, Elsevier (2014), ISBN 978-0-1241-1643-6
- Hilbe, Joseph M., Modeling Count Data, Cambridge University Press (2014) ISBN 978-1-1076-1125-2
- Shults, J. and J.M. Hilbe,Quasi-Least Squares Regression, Chapman & Hall/CRC (2014) ISBN 978-1-4200-9993-5
- Zuur, A.F, J.M. Hilbe, E.N Ieno, A Beginners Guide to GLM and GLMM with R, Highlands (2013) ISBN 978-0-9571-7413-9
- Hilbe, J.M. and A.P. Robinson, Methods of Statistical Model Estimation, Chapman & Hall/CRC (2013) ISBN 978-1-4398-5802-8
- Hardin, J.W. and J.M. Hilbe, Generalized Estimating Equations, Second Edition, Chapman & Hall/CRC Press (2012) ISBN 978-1-4398-8113-2
- Hilbe, Joseph M., Astrostatistical Challenges for the New Astronomy, Springer (2012) ISBN 978-1-4614-3507-5
- Hardin, J.W. and J.M. Hilbe, Generalized Linear Models and Extensions, Third Edition, Stata Press (2012) ISBN 978-1-5971-8105-1
- Hilbe, Joseph M., Negative Binomial Regression, Second Edition, Cambridge University Press (2011) ISBN 978-0-521-19815-8
- Muenchen, R.A. and J.M. Hilbe, R for Stata Users, Springer (2010) ISBN 978-1-4419-1317-3
- Hilbe, Joseph M., Logistic Regression Models, Chapman & Hall/CRC Press (2009) ISBN 978-1-4200-7575-5
- Hilbe, Joseph M., Solutions Manual for Logistic Regression Models, Chapman & Hall/CRC (2009) ISBN 978-1-4398-2066-7
- Hilbe, Joseph M., Negative Binomial Regression, Cambridge University Press (2007) ISBN 978-0-521-85772-7
- Hardin, J.W. and J.M. Hilbe, Generalized Linear Models and Extensions, Second Edition, Stata Press (2007) ISBN 978-1-59718-014-6
- Hardin, J.W. and J.M. Hilbe, Generalized Estimating Equations, Chapman & Hall/CRC Press (2003) ISBN 978-1-58488-307-4
- Hardin, J.W. and J.M. Hilbe, Generalized Linear Models and Extensions, Stata Press (2001) ISBN 1-881228-60-6
- Hilbe, Joseph, Stata Technical Bulletin Reprints, Volume 2, (editor) Stata Press (1993) ISBN 1-881228-07-X
- Hilbe, Joseph, Stata Technical Bulletin Reprints, Volume 1, (editor) Stata Press (1992) ISBN 1-881228-05-3
- Hilbe, Joseph, Sentential Logic, Educational Services Pub. Co. (1983) ASIN: 1881228606
- Hilbe, Joseph M., Fundamentals of Conceptual Analysis, Kendall/Hunt (1977) ISBN 0-8403-1759-X
- Hilbe, Joseph, Philosophical Foundations of Law, Educational Services Pub. Co. (1973) ASIN: B005ONKCO2
- Hilbe, J.M, Philosophy: Past and Present (2 volume), Educational Services Pub Co (1972) ASIN: B0052GQ4JI
- Hilbe, J.M., Experiencing Philosophy, Educational Services Pub. Co. (1970) ASIN: B0082YUQLE

== Publications: Major book chapters and encyclopedia articles ==
- Hilbe, Joseph M., (2012), Astrostatistics: A Brief History and View into the Future in Hilbe, J.M (ed) Astrostatistical Challenges for the New Astronomy, New York: Springer ISBN 978-1-4614-3507-5
- Hilbe, Joseph M., (2012), Astrostatistics in the International Arena in Feigelson, E.D. and G.J. Babu, (ed) Statistical Challenges in Modern Astronomy V, New York: Springer ISBN 978-1-4614-2596-0
- Hilbe, J.M. and W.H. Greene, (2011), Chapter 4: Count Response Regression Models, in C. R. Rao, J.P. Miller, and D.C.Rao (Eds), Essential Statistical Methods for Medical Statistics, Oxford, UK: New Holland ISBN 978-0-4445-3737-9
- Hilbe, Joseph M., Logistic Regression, StatProb: The Encyclopedia Sponsored by Statistics and Probability Societies (2010).
- Hilbe, Joseph M., Modeling Count Data, StatProb: The Encyclopedia Sponsored by Statistics and Probability Societies (2010).
- Hilbe, Joseph M., Generalized Linear Models, StatProb: The Encyclopedia Sponsored by Statistics and Probability Societies (2010).
- Hilbe, Joseph M., Logistic Regression in M. Lovric (editor), International Encyclopedia of Statistical Science, New York: Springer (2010). ISBN 978-3-642-04897-5
- Hilbe, Joseph M., Modeling Count Data in M. Lovric (editor), International Encyclopedia of Statistical Science, New York: Springer (2010). ISBN 978-3-642-04897-5
- Hilbe, Joseph M., Generalized Linear Models in M. Lovric (editor), International Encyclopedia of Statistical Science, New York: Springer (2010). ISBN 978-3-642-04897-5
- Hilbe, Joseph M, Statistical Software for the Social Sciences, in Kolenikov, S., L A. Thombs, and D. Steinley, (Eds), Statistics in the Social Sciences: Current Methodological Developments, Hoboken, New Jersey: Wiley. pages 175–189.(2010)
- Hilbe, J.M., G. Miner, and R. Nisbet, Astro-Statistics: Data Mining of SkyLab Project: Hubble Telescope Star and Galaxy Data, Tutorial SS, in Nisbet, R, J. Elder, and G. Miner (Eds), Handbook of Statistical Analysis & Data Mining Applications, New York:Elsevier (2009),ISBN 978-0-12-374765-5
- Hilbe, J.M. and J.W. Hardin, Generalized Estimating Equations for Longitudinal Panel Analysis in S. Menard (Editor), Handbook of Longitudinal Research: Design, Measurement, and Analysis across the Social Sciences, London, UK: Academic Press/Elsevier (2007).
- Hilbe, Joseph and William Greene, Count Response Regression Models, in C.R. Rao, J.P. Miller, and D.C.Rao (Editors), Handbook of Statistics, Vol 27: Epidemiology and Medical Statistics, London, UK: North Holland/Elsevier (2007).
- Holmes, J.D., J. Rohn, and J. Hilbe, Informatics and Software Applications for Data Analyses in Van Beneden, C. and N. Mikanatha, (editors), Infectious Disease Surveillance, London: Blackwell (2007).
- Hardin, J.W. and J.M. Hilbe (2007). "Generalized Estimating Equations" in Encyclopedia of Clinical Trials, New York: Wiley & Son Pub.
- Hilbe, Joseph M., The Coevolution of Statistics and Hz. In S. Sawilowsky (ed.),Real Data Analysis, American Educational Research Association, SIG/Educational Statisticians: Information Age Publishing (2006).
- Hamilton, L. and J. Hilbe Statistical Analysis Using Stata, in R. Stine & J. Fox (Editors), Statistical Computing Environments for Social Research, Sage Publishing Co. (1997).
- Hilbe, J. and B. Turlach, Generalized Linear Models, in W. Haerdle, S. Klinke, B Turlach (Editors), XploRe: An interactive Statistical Computing Environment, Springer-Verlag (1995).

== See also ==
- Stata
- Statistics
- International Astrostatistics Association
- The American Statistician
- American Statistical Association
- Royal Statistical Society
- International Statistical Institute
- American Astronomical Society
