= Solar variability =

Solar variability refers to changes in solar activity, such as:

- Solar variation, the change in the amount of radiation emitted by the Sun (see Solar radiation)
  - see also solar cycle, specifically for the 11-year cyclic variation in solar activity
- Changes in the solar wind, i.e., charged particles (moving much slower than the speed of light)
