= Solar Max =

Solar Max may refer to:

- The solar maximum period of greatest sunspot activity in the 11 year solar cycle of the Sun
- The Solar Maximum Mission satellite to investigate solar phenomena
