= V. Ashley Villar =

American astrophysicist

Victoria Ashley Villar
- Born: Vero Beach, Florida, United States
- Citizenship: American
- Education: MIT (B.Sc. 2014); Harvard University (Ph.D. 2020)
- Known for: Time-domain astronomy
- Scientific career
- Fields: Astronomy; astrophysics
- Workplaces: Columbia University; Pennsylvania State University; Harvard University
- Website: http://ashleyvillar.com/

Victoria Ashley Villar is an American astrophysicist who studies the death and collision of stars and their by-products using machine learning. She also researches the origins of the heavy elements. She is currently an assistant professor at Harvard University.

== Early life and education ==
After graduating from the Vero Beach High School in Florida, Villar attended the Massachusetts Institute of Technology (MIT), where she received her Bachelor of Science in Physics with a minor in Mathematics in 2014. As an undergraduate, she wrote her senior thesis on asteroseismology with the assistance of professors John Johnson and Josh Winn. She earned her Ph.D. in Astronomy and Astrophysics from Harvard University in 2020. Villar was subsequently a postdoctoral researcher at Columbia University. After her time at Columbia, Villar became a faculty member at Pennsylvania State University from 2021-2022 and eventually left to return to Harvard as an assistant professor. She was listed in the Science Category of the Forbes 30 Under 30 list in 2022.

== Research and awards ==
In February 2024, Villar and her research team had a funded three-day workshop by the Harvard Data Science Initiative (HDSI) Faculty Special Projects Fund to work with the same software used during the 2018 Photometric LSST Astronomical Time-Series Classification Challenge (PLAsTiCC) in order to study anomaly detection in celestial observations. Villar is listed among model contributors on the PLAsTiCC meet the team webpage. Villar also uses data from the Vera C. Rubin Observatory in her work, for which she has received multiple awards. Additionally, she studies the thermal radiation emitted by binary neutron-star mergers, known as kilonovae in relation to gravitational-wave detectors and multi-messenger studies within time-domain astrophysics.

Using artificial intelligence, Villar and her colleagues identified SN 2023zkd as a supernova involving a massive star and a black hole.

Villar considers the use of machine learning to be fundamental to her work, comparing it to the adoption of statistics in scientific research, an important—even revolutionary—step forward. Machine learning saves time and energy in analyzing massive data sets encountered in astronomy and astrophysics. However, she cautions against the uncritical use of this technology when simpler techniques, such as linear algebra, could do better.

== See also ==
- Astroinformatics
- High-energy astronomy
