= International Astrostatistics Association =

International Astrostatistics Association (IAA)
- Formation: 2012; 14 years ago
- Type: Learned society
- Purpose: "to foster collaboration between astronomers, statisticians and data scientists throughout the world; to advance the statistical expertise among members of the astronomical community; to serve as the global organization devoted to the advance of astrostatistics and astroinformatics"
- Headquarters: Milan, Italy
- President: Jogesh Babu
- Website: iaa.mi.oa-brera.inaf.it

The International Astrostatistics Association (IAA) is a non-profit professional organization for astrostatisticians. Astrostatistics as a discipline is composed of astrophysicists, statisticians, and those in computer information sciences who have an interest in the statistical analysis and data mining of astronomical data. The Association was founded as an independent organization in August 2012 by the Astrostatistics Committee and Network of the International Statistical Institute (ISI).

The foremost objective of the IAA is to foster collaboration between statisticians and astrophysicists. The Association is managed by the IAA Council, composed of representatives from the ISI Astrostatistics Committee and the Astrostatistics Working Groups of the International Astronomical Union (IAU) and American Astronomical Society (AAS). The IAA has its convention in association with the biannual ISI World Statistics Congress.

In April 2014, an independent group was created with the support of the IAA, the Cosmostatistics Initiative (COIN), chaired by Dr. Rafael S. de Souza. COIN is a worldwide endeavor aimed to create an interdisciplinary community around data-driven problems in Astronomy. It was designed to promote innovation in all aspects of academic scientific research.

IAA Presidents and terms

- 2012–2017 Joseph Hilbe (USA)
- 2018–present Jogesh Babu (USA)

== See also ==
- List of astronomical societies
