= Solar maximum =

Regular period of greatest solar activity

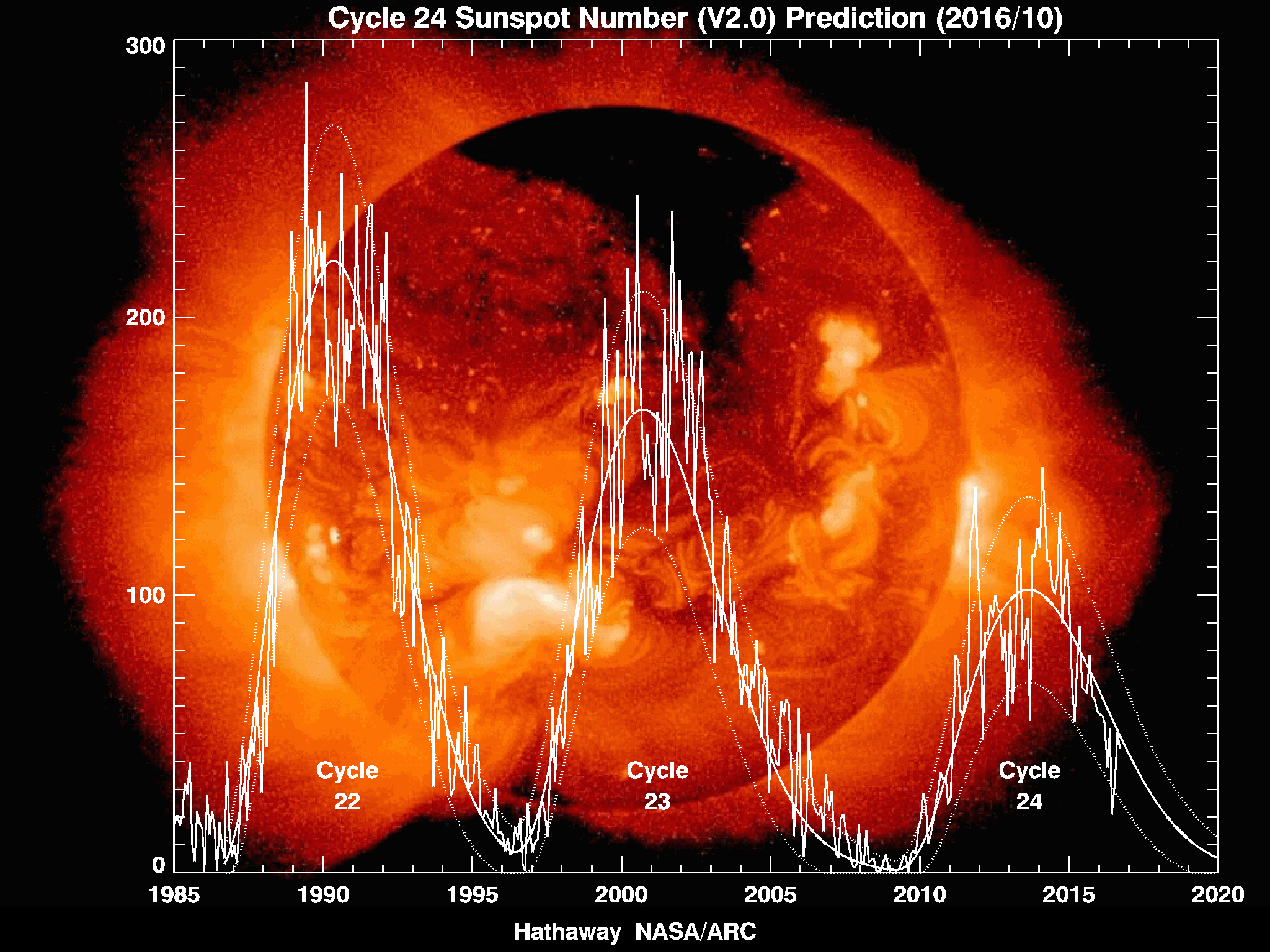
A prediction for Sunspot Cycle 24 (2008-2020) gives a smoothed sunspot number maximum of about 66 in the Summer of 2013. Current observations make this the smallest sunspot cycle since records began in the 1750s.

Solar maximum is the regular period of greatest solar activity during the Sun's 11-year solar cycle. During solar maximum, large numbers of sunspots appear, and the solar irradiance output grows by about 0.07%. On average, the solar cycle takes about 11 years to go from one solar maximum to the next, with duration observed varying from 9 to 14 years.

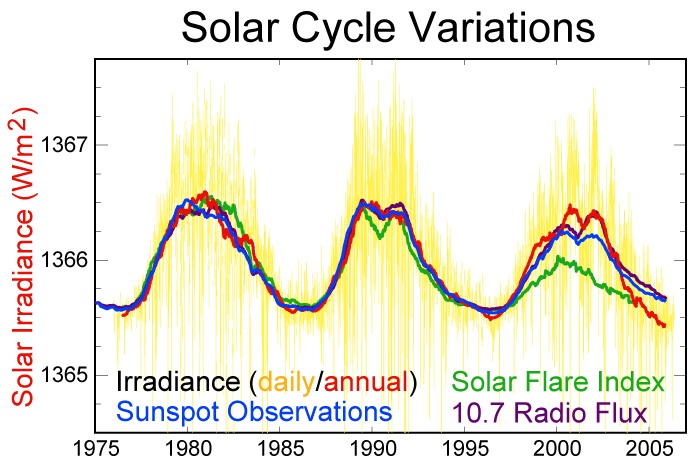
Three recent solar cycles

Large solar storms often occur during solar maximum. For example, the Carrington Event, which took place a few months before the solar maximum of solar cycle 10, was the most intense geomagnetic storm in recorded history and widely considered to have been caused by an equally large solar storm.

== Predictions ==
Predictions of a future maximum's timing and strength are very difficult; predictions vary widely. There was a solar maximum in 2000. In 2006, NASA initially expected a solar maximum in 2010 or 2011, and thought that it could be the strongest since 1958. However, the solar maximum was not declared to have occurred until 2014, and even then was ranked among the weakest on record.

== Grand solar minima and maxima ==
In addition to the ~11 year solar cycle, the intensity of the solar maxima can vary from cycle to cycle. When several solar cycles exhibit greater than average activity for decades or centuries, this period is labelled "grand solar maximum". Solar cycles still occur during these grand solar maximum periods, but the intensity of those cycles is greater. Likewise, extended periods in which the solar maximum is lower than average are labeled "grand solar minima". Some researchers suggest that grand solar maxima have shown some correlation with global and regional climate changes, although others dispute this hypothesis (e.g., see Medieval Warm Period).

Following the advent of telescopic solar observation with Galileo's 1611 observations, the intensity of solar maxima is typically measured by counting numbers and size of sunspots; for periods previous to this, isotope ratios in ice cores can be used to estimate solar activity. The table below shows the approximate dates of some of the proposed solar minima in historical times.

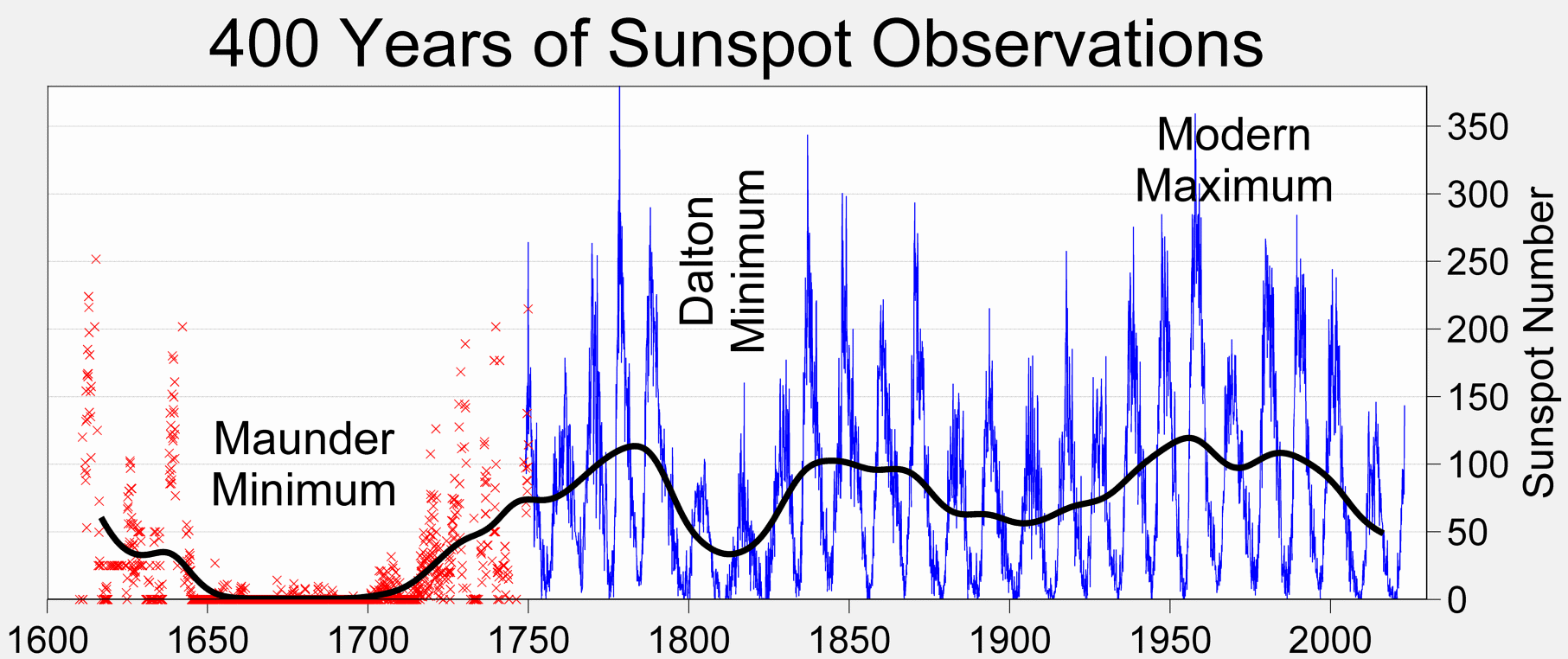
400 year history of sunspot numbers.

Solar minimum and maximum events and approximate dates
Event	Start	End
Homeric minimum	950 BC	800 BC
Oort minimum	1040	1080
Medieval maximum	1100	1250
Wolf minimum	1280	1350
Spörer Minimum	1450	1550
Maunder Minimum	1645	1715
Dalton Minimum	1790	1820
Modern Maximum	1914	2008
Unspecified	2009	present

A proposed list of historical Grand minima of solar activity includes also Grand minima ca. 690 AD, 360 BC, 770 BC, 1390 BC, 2860 BC, 3340 BC, 3500 BC, 3630 BC, 3940 BC, 4230 BC, 4330 BC, 5260 BC, 5460 BC, 5620 BC, 5710 BC, 5990 BC, 6220 BC, 6400 BC, 7040 BC, 7310 BC, 7520 BC, 8220 BC, 9170 BC.

== See also ==
- Solar wind
- Solar variation
- Solar minimum
- List of solar cycles – table of solar cycles
