= Lori Thombs =

American statistician

Lori A. Thombs is an American statistician whose interests include social statistics, time series, and resampling. She is an associate professor of statistics at the University of Missouri, where she directs the Social Science Statistics Center, and president of the Southern Regional Council On Statistics.

== Education and career ==
Thombs is a 1981 graduate of Baylor University, and completed a Ph.D. in statistics at Southern Methodist University in 1985. Her dissertation, Bootstrap Prediction Intervals for Autoregression, was supervised by William R. Schucany.

She joined the statistics department at the University of South Carolina, in Columbia, South Carolina, in 1985, and moved to the University of Missouri, in Columbia, Missouri, in 2003.

She was elected president of the Southern Regional Council On Statistics in 2018.

== Books ==
Thombs is a coauthor, with Don Edwards and John D. Spurrier, of the books Elementary Statistics Laboratory Manual (in two versions, Wadsworth, 1995) and Statistics: Learning by Doing (Whittier, 1999). She is a coeditor, with Stanislav Kolenikov and Douglas Steinle, of Statistics in the Social Sciences: Current Methodological Developments (Wiley, 2010).

== Recognition ==
Thombs was named a Fellow of the American Statistical Association in 2011.
