= Astronomy and Computing =

- Discipline: Astronomy, computing science
- Language: English
- Edited by: Fabio Pasian

Publication details
- History: 2013–present
- Publisher: Elsevier
- Impact factor: 1.927 (2020)

Standard abbreviations
- ISO 4: Astron. Comput.

Indexing
- ISSN: 2213-1337
- LCCN: 2013205309
- OCLC no.: 827179545

Links
- Journal homepage; Online access

Astronomy and Computing is a peer-reviewed scientific journal covering research on applications computer science in astronomy published by Elsevier. It was established in 2013 and is abstracted and indexed in the Astrophysics Data System, INSPEC and Scopus. The current editor-in-chief is Fabio Pasian (Astronomical Observatory of Trieste).

== History ==
The importance of astronomical software to generating research results has grown, and indeed, much of modern research depends on software. Though occasionally discussed casually, the idea for a journal devoted to computational methods in astronomy was formally discussed at the Astronomical Data Analysis Software and Systems (ADASS) XX conference in a Birds of a Feather session in 2010, where it was demonstrated that the major astronomy publications are often reluctant to include purely computational articles, though other journals may be more accepting. The publication of computational methods is seen as an important step to bring those who write research software into the academic credit production system.

The development of Astronomy & Computing was presented in 2012 in a poster session at the Astronomical Data Analysis Software and Systems (ADASS) XXII conference, and the journal's first issue was published in February, 2013.
