= Solar phenomena =

Natural phenomena within the Sun's atmosphere

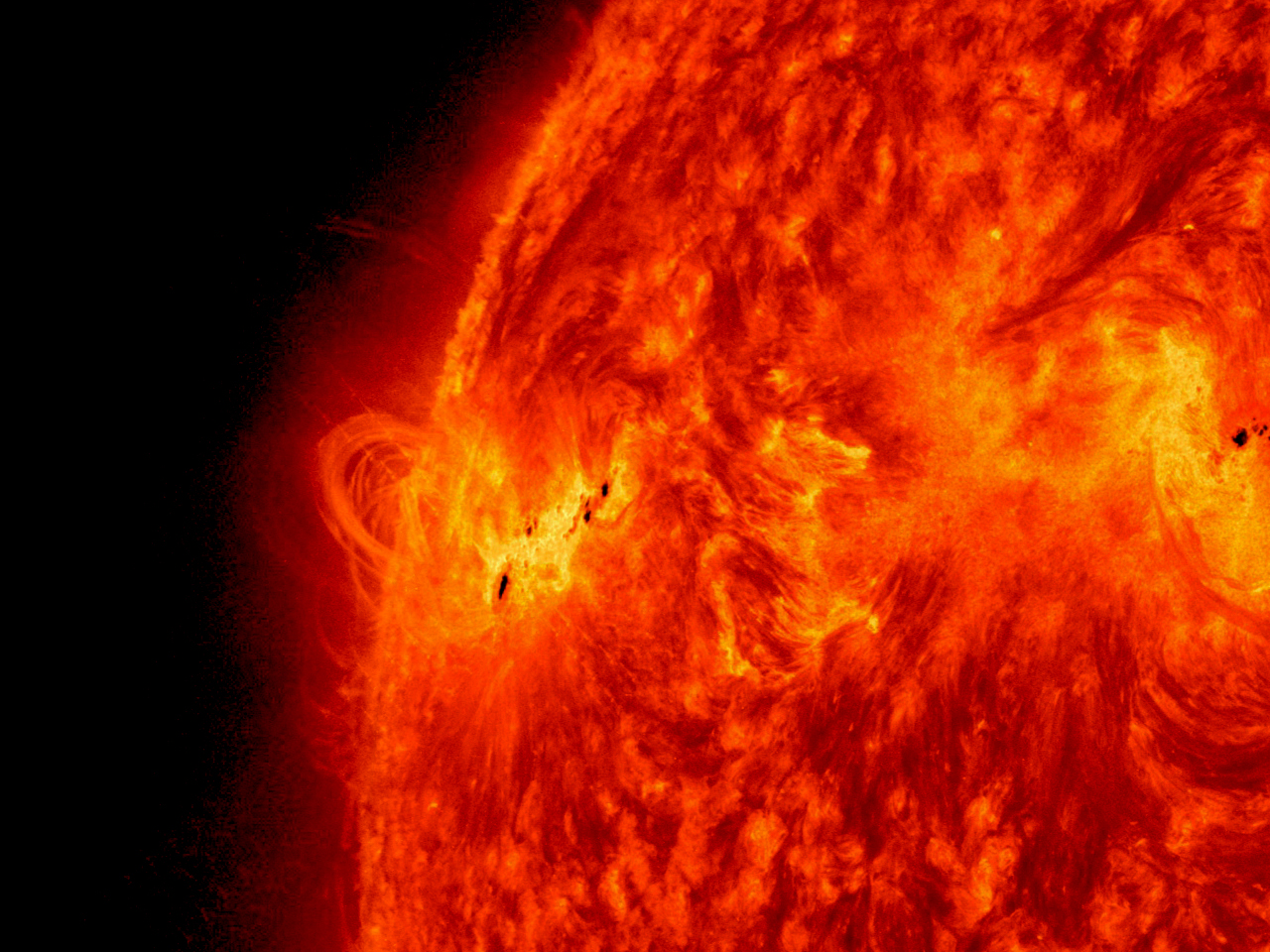
Solar activity: NASA's Solar Dynamics Observatory captured this image of the X1.2 class solar flare on May 14, 2013. The image shows light with a wavelength of 304 angstroms.

Solar phenomena are natural phenomena which occur within the atmosphere of the Sun. They take many forms, including solar wind, radio wave flux, solar flares, coronal mass ejections, coronal heating and sunspots.

These phenomena are believed to be generated by a helical dynamo, located near the center of the Sun's mass, which generates strong magnetic fields, as well as a chaotic dynamo, located near the surface, which generates smaller magnetic field fluctuations. All solar fluctuations together are referred to as solar variation, producing space weather within the Sun's gravitational field.

Solar activity and related events have been recorded since the eighth century BCE. Throughout history, observation technology and methodology advanced, and in the 20th century, interest in astrophysics surged and many solar telescopes were constructed. The 1931 invention of the coronagraph allowed the corona to be studied in full daylight.

== Sun ==
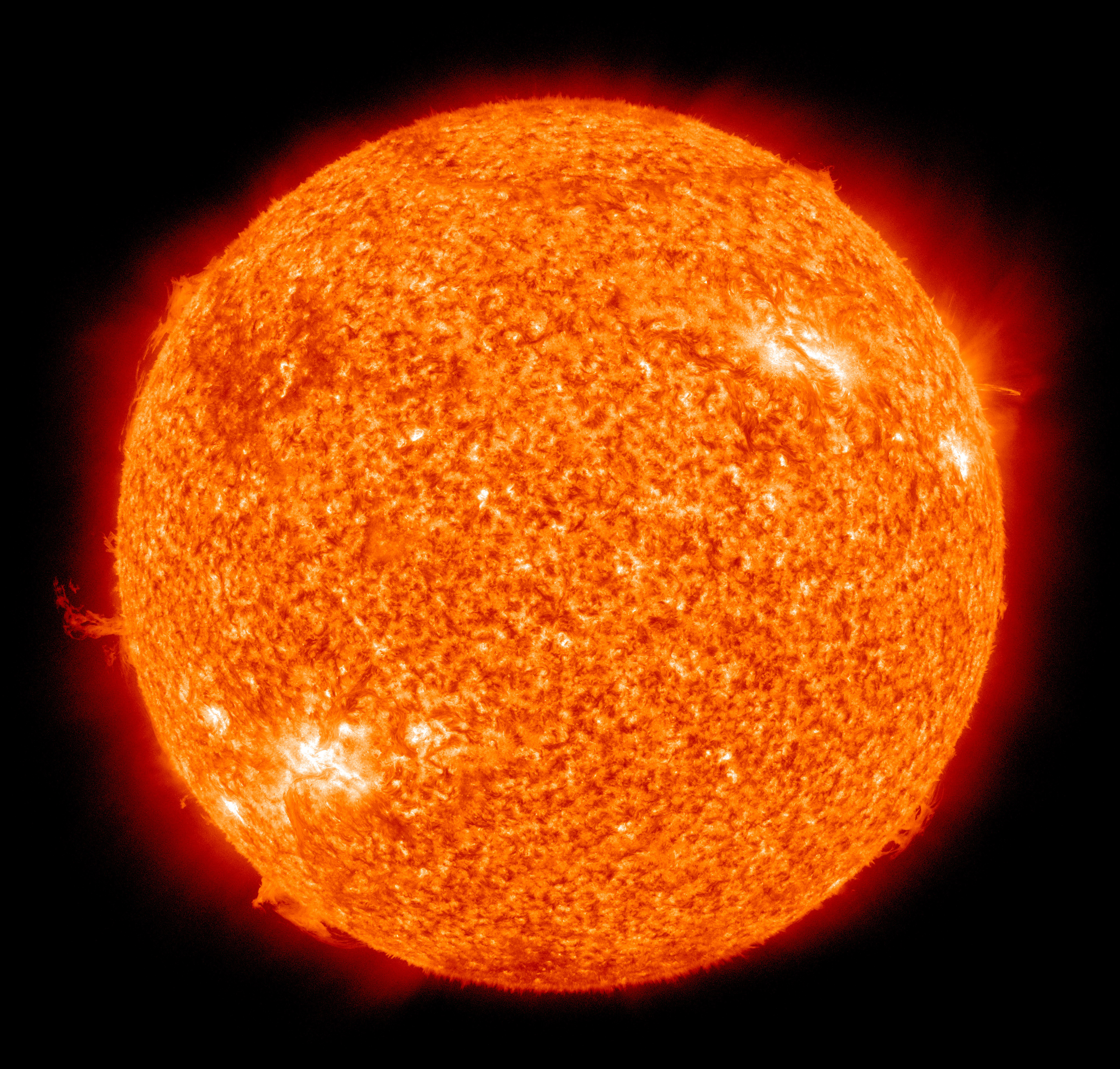
False-color image of the Sun showing its turbulent surface. (credit: NASA-SDO)

The Sun is a star located at the center of the Solar System. It is almost perfectly spherical and consists of hot plasma and magnetic fields. It has a diameter of about 1,392,684 kilometres (865,374 mi), around 109 times that of Earth, and its mass (1.989×10^{30} kilograms, approximately 330,000 times that of Earth) accounts for some 99.86% of the total mass of the Solar System. Chemically, about three quarters of the Sun's mass consists of hydrogen, while the rest is mostly helium. The remaining 1.69% (equal to 5,600 times the mass of Earth) consists of heavier elements, including oxygen, carbon, neon and iron.

The Sun formed about 4.567 billion (Note: All numbers in this article are short scale. One billion is 10^{9}, or 1,000,000,000.) years ago from the gravitational collapse of a region within a large molecular cloud. Most of the matter gathered in the center, while the rest flattened into an orbiting disk that became the balance of the Solar System. The central mass became increasingly hot and dense, eventually initiating thermonuclear fusion in its core.

The Sun is a G-type main-sequence star (G2V) based on spectral class, and it is informally designated as a yellow dwarf because its visible radiation is most intense in the yellow-green portion of the spectrum. It is actually white, but from the Earth's surface, it appears yellow because of atmospheric scattering of blue light. In the spectral class label, G2 indicates its surface temperature, of approximately 5770 K ( the UAI will accept in 2014 5772 K ) and V indicates that the Sun, like most stars, is a main-sequence star, and thus generates its energy via fusing hydrogen into helium. In its core, the Sun fuses about 620 million metric tons of hydrogen each second.

The Earth's mean distance from the Sun is approximately 1 astronomical unit (about 150,000,000 km; 93,000,000 mi), though the distance varies as the Earth moves from perihelion in January to aphelion in July. At this average distance, light travels from the Sun to Earth in about 8 minutes, 19 seconds. The energy of this sunlight supports almost all life (Note: Hydrothermal vent communities live so deep under the sea that they have no access to sunlight. Bacteria instead use sulfur compounds as an energy source, via chemosynthesis.) on Earth by photosynthesis, and drives Earth's climate and weather. As recent as the 19th century, scientists had little knowledge of the Sun's physical composition and source of energy. This understanding is still developing; a number of present-day anomalies in the Sun's behavior remain unexplained.

== Solar cycle ==
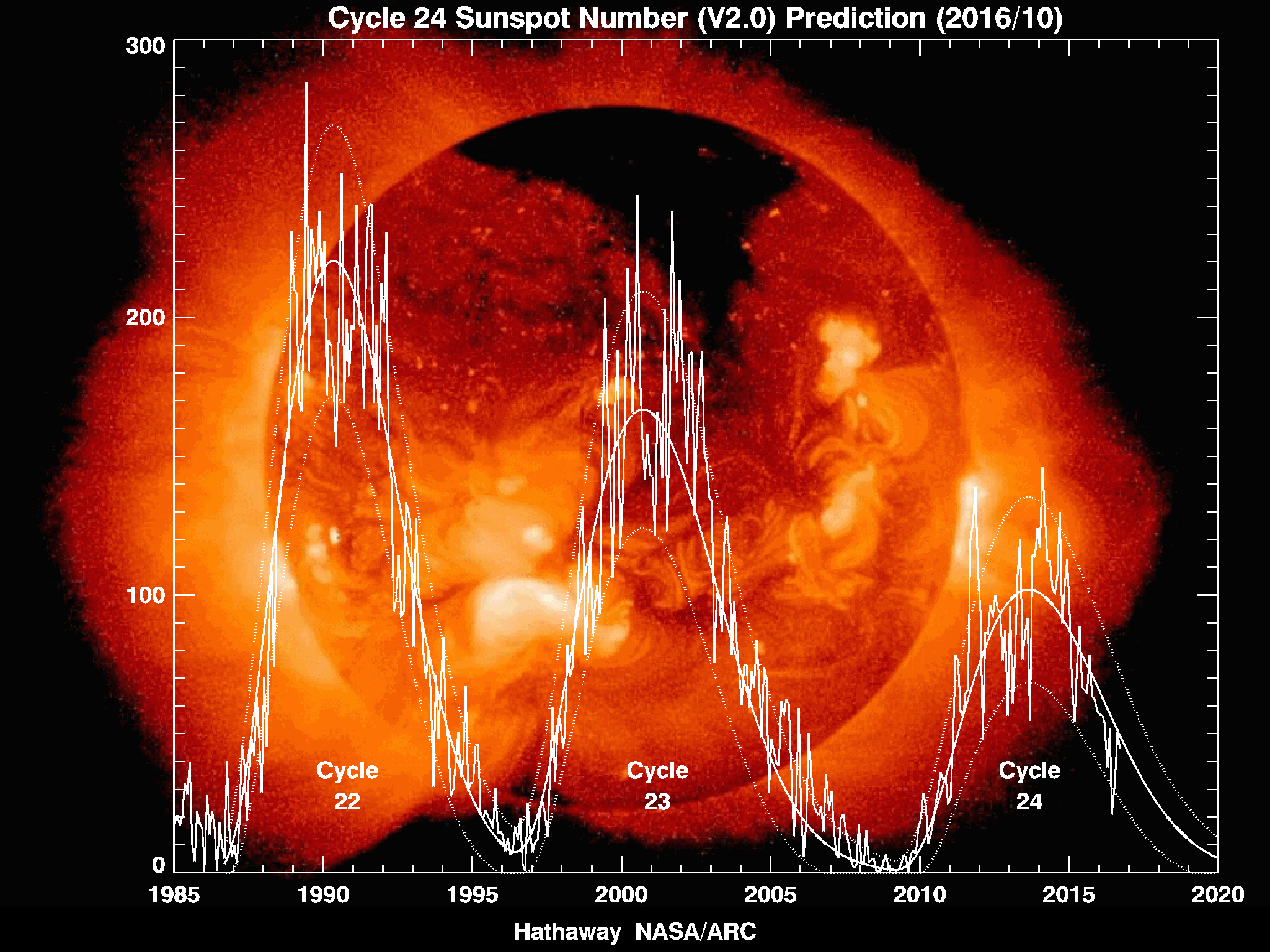
Prediction of sunspot cycle

Many solar phenomena change periodically over an average interval of about 11 years. This solar cycle affects solar irradiation and influences space weather, terrestrial weather, and climate.

The solar cycle also modulates the flux of short-wavelength solar radiation, from ultraviolet to X-ray and influences the frequency of solar flares, coronal mass ejections and other solar eruptive phenomena.

== Types ==
=== Coronal mass ejections ===
A video of the series of coronal mass ejections in August 2010

A coronal mass ejection (CME) is a massive burst of solar wind and magnetic fields rising above the solar corona. Near solar maxima, the Sun produces about three CMEs every day, whereas solar minima feature about one every five days. CMEs, along with solar flares of other origin, can disrupt radio transmissions and damage satellites and electrical transmission line facilities, resulting in potentially massive and long-lasting power outages.

Coronal mass ejections often appear with other forms of solar activity, most notably solar flares, but no causal relationship has been established. Most weak flares do not have CMEs; however, most powerful ones do. Most ejections originate from active regions on the Sun's surface, such as sunspot groupings associated with frequent flares. Other forms of solar activity frequently associated with coronal mass ejections are eruptive prominences, coronal dimming, coronal waves and Moreton waves, also called solar tsunami.

Magnetic reconnection is responsible for CME and solar flares. Magnetic reconnection is the name given to the rearrangement of magnetic field lines when two oppositely directed magnetic fields are brought together. This rearrangement is accompanied with a sudden release of energy stored in the original oppositely directed fields.

When a CME impacts the Earth's magnetosphere, it temporarily deforms the Earth's magnetic field, changing the direction of compass needles and inducing large electrical ground currents in Earth itself; this is called a geomagnetic storm, and it is a global phenomenon. CME impacts can induce magnetic reconnection in Earth's magnetotail (the midnight side of the magnetosphere); this launches protons and electrons downward toward Earth's atmosphere, where they form the aurora.

=== Flares ===
A solar flare is a sudden flash of brightness observed over the Sun's surface or the solar limb, which is interpreted as an energy release of up to 6 × 10^{25} joules (about a sixth of the total Sun's energy output each second or 160 billion megatons of TNT equivalent, over 25,000 times more energy than released from the impact of Comet Shoemaker–Levy 9 with Jupiter). It may be followed by a coronal mass ejection. The flare ejects clouds of electrons, ions and atoms through the corona into space. These clouds typically reach Earth a day or two after the event. Similar phenomena in other stars are known as stellar flares.

Solar flares strongly influence space weather near the Earth. They can produce streams of highly energetic particles in the solar wind, known as a solar proton event. These particles can impact the Earth's magnetosphere in the form of a geomagnetic storm and present radiation hazards to spacecraft and astronauts.

A solar flare

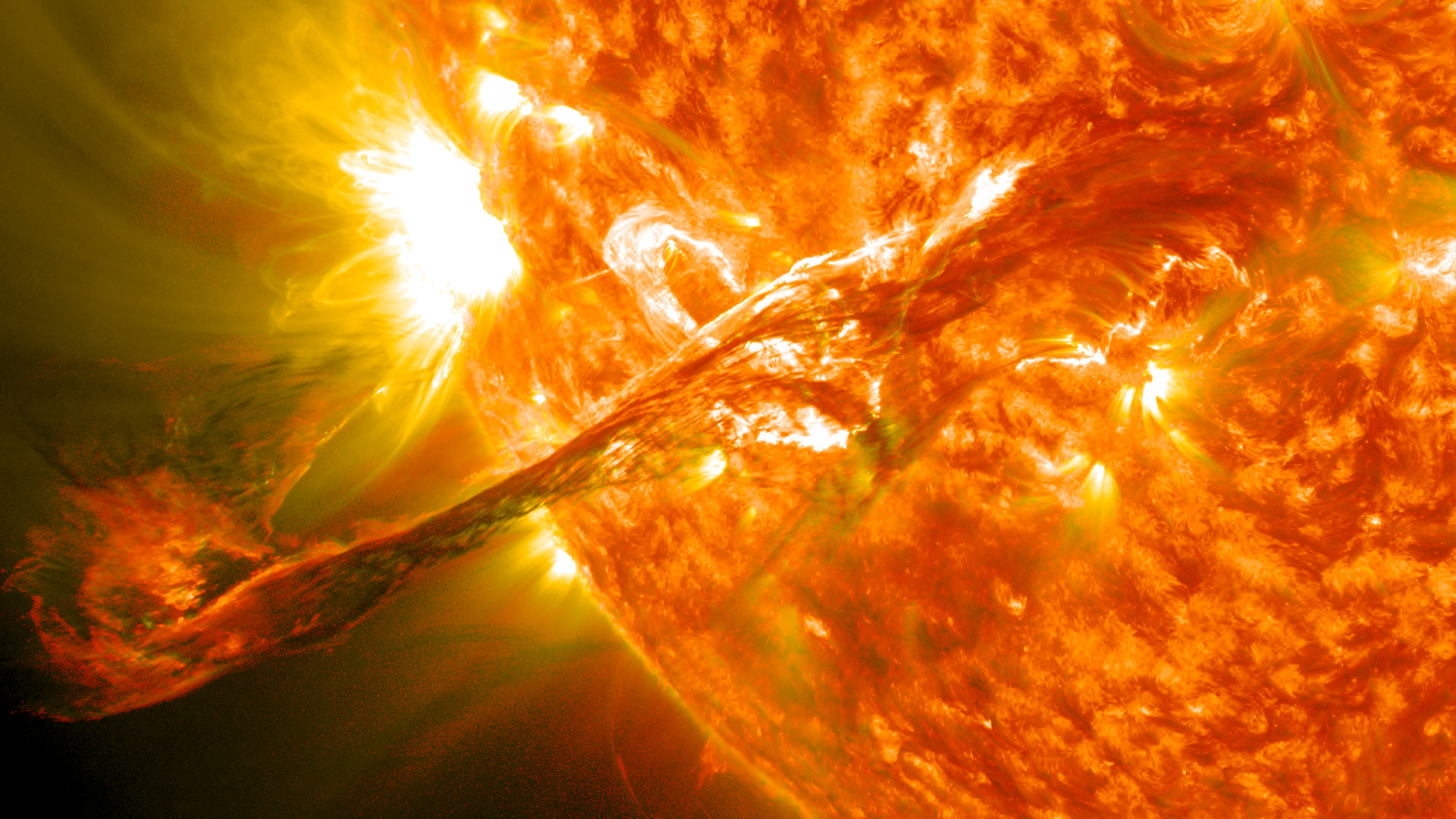
On August 31, 2012, a long prominence/filament of solar material that had been hovering in the Sun's atmosphere, the corona, erupted out into space at 4:36 p.m. EDT.

Diagram of the magnetic-field structure of a solar flare and its origin, inferred to result from the deformation of such a magnetic structure linking the solar interior with the solar atmosphere up through the corona.

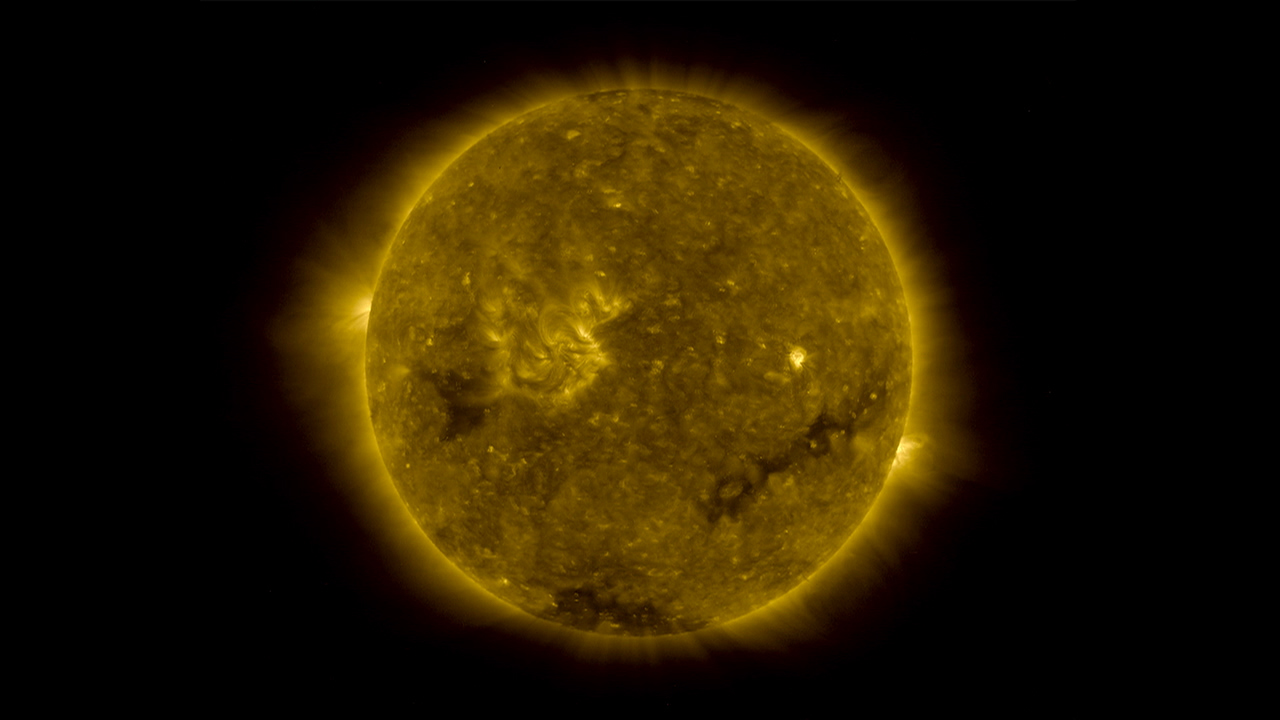
A complete 2D-Image taken by STEREO (High Resolution)

=== Solar proton events ===
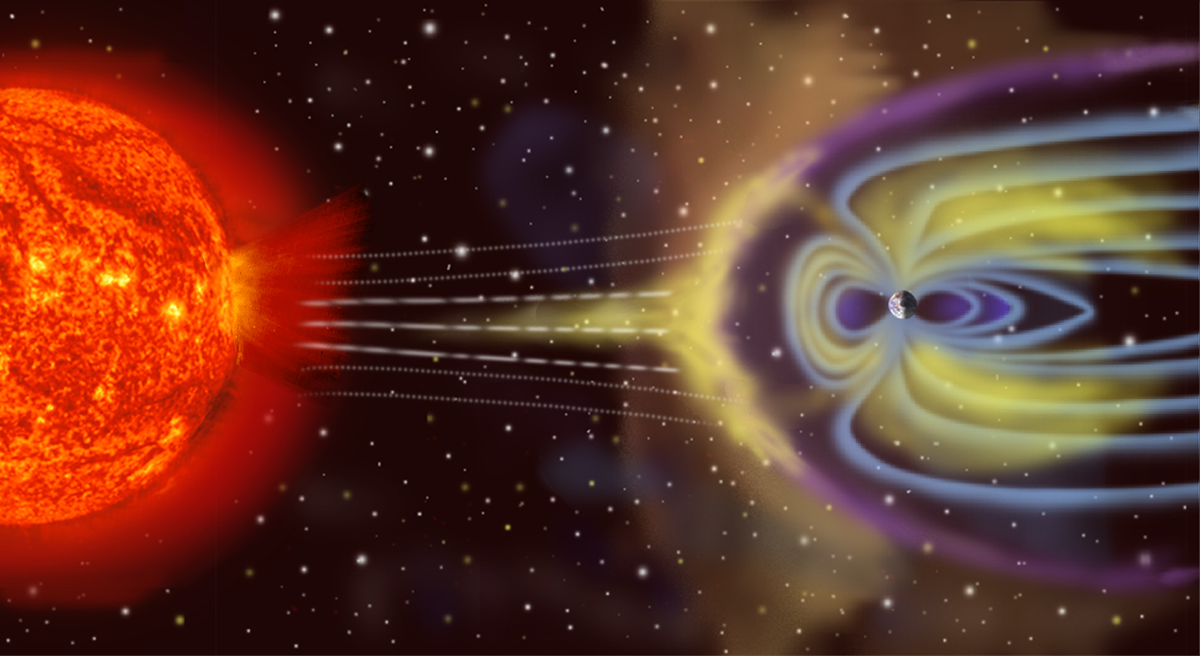
Solar particles interact with Earth's magnetosphere. Sizes not to scale.

A solar proton event (SPE), or "proton storm", occurs when particles (mostly protons) emitted by the Sun become accelerated either close to the Sun during a flare or in interplanetary space by CME shocks. The events can include other nuclei such as helium ions and HZE ions. These particles cause multiple effects. They can penetrate the Earth's magnetic field and cause ionization in the ionosphere. The effect is similar to auroral events, except that protons rather than electrons are involved. Energetic protons are a significant radiation hazard to spacecraft and astronauts. Energetic protons can reach Earth within 30 minutes of a major flare's peak.

=== Prominences ===
A video clip of an erupting solar prominence, a CME.

A prominence is a large, bright, gaseous feature extending outward from the Sun's surface, often in the shape of a loop. Prominences are anchored to the Sun's surface in the photosphere and extend outwards into the corona. While the corona consists of high temperature plasma, which does not emit much visible light, prominences contain much cooler plasma, similar in composition to that of the chromosphere.

Prominence plasma is typically a hundred times cooler and denser than coronal plasma. A prominence forms over timescales of about an earthly day and may persist for weeks or months. Some prominences break apart and form CMEs.

A typical prominence extends over many thousands of kilometers; the largest on record was estimated at over 800,000 kilometres (500,000 mi) long – roughly the solar radius.

When a prominence is viewed against the Sun instead of space, it appears darker than the background. This formation is called a solar filament. It is possible for a projection to be both a filament and a prominence. Some prominences are so powerful that they eject matter at speeds ranging from 600 km/s to more than 1000 km/s. Other prominences form huge loops or arching columns of glowing gases over sunspots that can reach heights of hundreds of thousands of kilometers.

=== Sunspots ===
Sunspots are relatively dark areas on the Sun's radiating 'surface' (photosphere) where intense magnetic activity inhibits convection and cools the Photosphere. Faculae are slightly brighter areas that form around sunspot groups as the flow of energy to the photosphere is re-established and both the normal flow and the sunspot-blocked energy elevate the radiating 'surface' temperature. Scientists began speculating on possible relationships between sunspots and solar luminosity in the 17th century. Luminosity decreases caused by sunspots (generally < - 0.3%) are correlated with increases (generally < + 0.05%) caused both by faculae that are associated with active regions as well as the magnetically active 'bright network'.

The net effect during periods of enhanced solar magnetic activity is increased radiant solar output because faculae are larger and persist longer than sunspots. Conversely, periods of lower solar magnetic activity and fewer sunspots (such as the Maunder Minimum) may correlate with times of lower irradiance.

Sunspot activity has been measured using the Wolf number for about 300 years. This index (also known as the Zürich number) uses both the number of sunspots and the number of sunspot groups to compensate for measurement variations. A 2003 study found that sunspots had been more frequent since the 1940s than in the previous 1150 years.

Sunspots usually appear as pairs with opposite magnetic polarity. Detailed observations reveal patterns, in yearly minima and maxima and in relative location. As each cycle proceeds, the latitude of spots declines, from 30 to 45° to around 7° after the solar maximum. This latitudinal change follows Spörer's law.

For a sunspot to be visible to the human eye it must be about 50,000 km in diameter, covering 2,000,000,000 square kilometres (770,000,000 sq mi) or 700 millionths of the visible area. Over recent cycles, approximately 100 sunspots or compact sunspot groups are visible from Earth. (Note: This is based on the hypothesis that the average human eye may have a resolution of 3.3×10^{−4} radians or 70 arc seconds, with a 1.5 millimetres (0.059 in) maximum pupil dilation in relatively bright light.)

Sunspots expand and contract as they move about and can travel at a few hundred meters per second when they first appear.

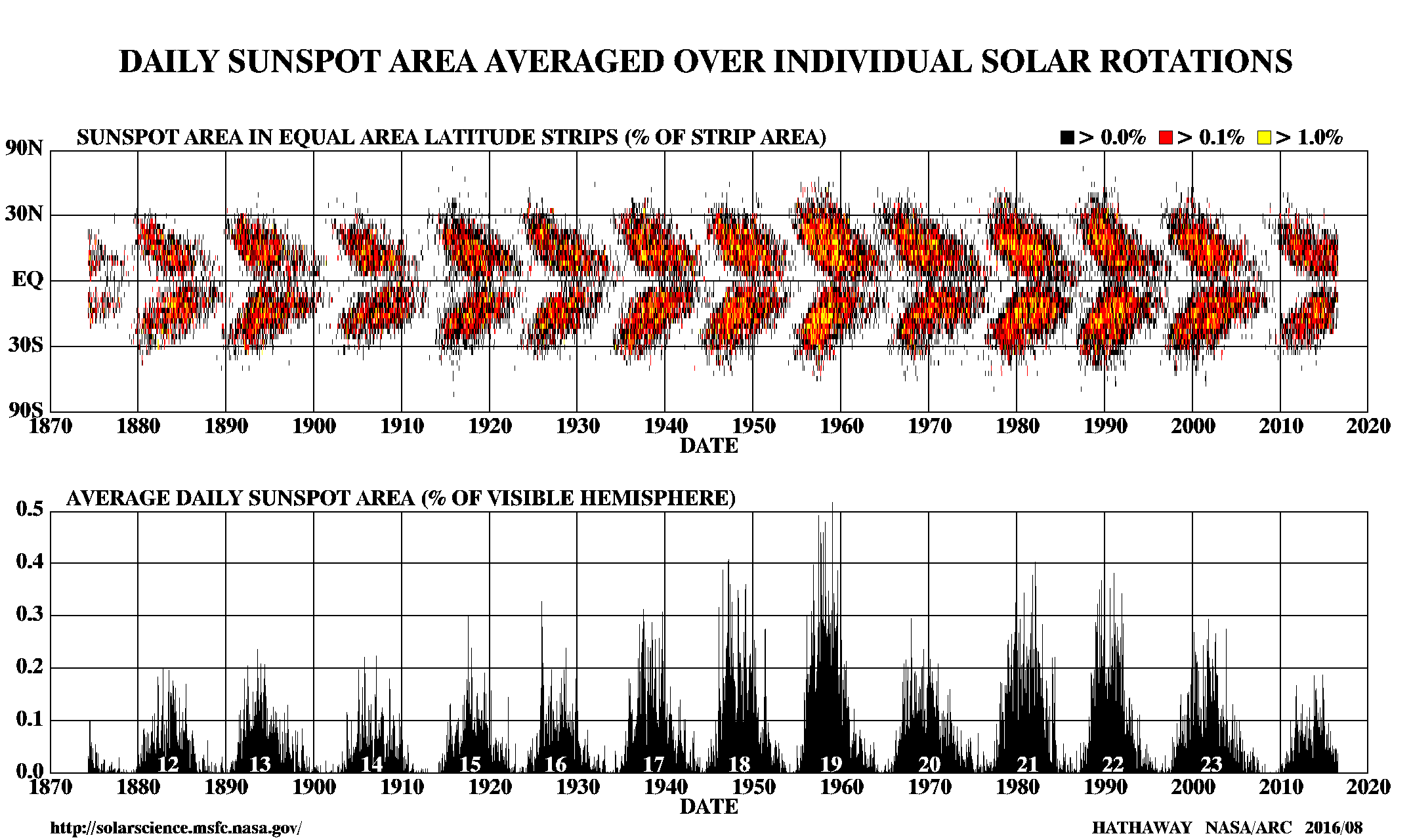
Spörer's law noted that at the start of an 11-year sunspot cycle, the spots appeared first at higher latitudes and later in progressively lower latitudes.

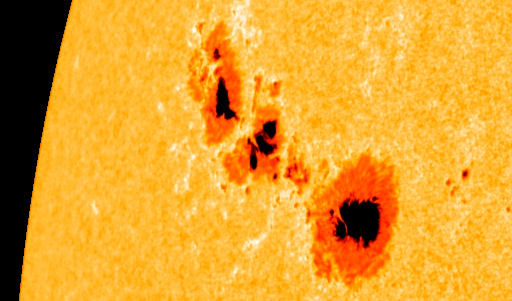
A report in the Daily Mail characterized sunspot 1302 as a "behemoth" unleashing huge solar flares.

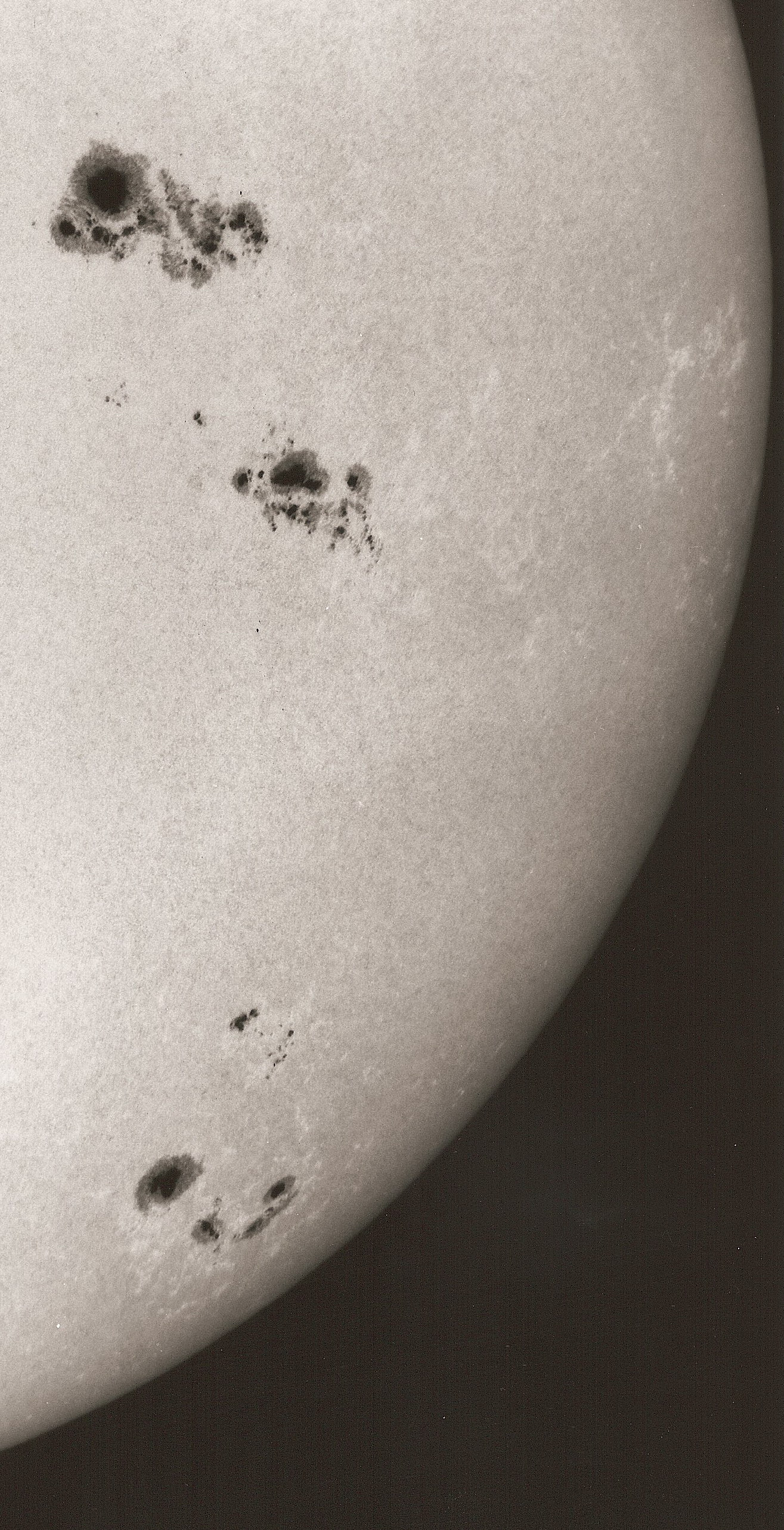
Detail of the Sun's surface, analog photography with a 4" Refractor, yellow glass filter and foil filter ND 4, Observatory Großhadern, Munich

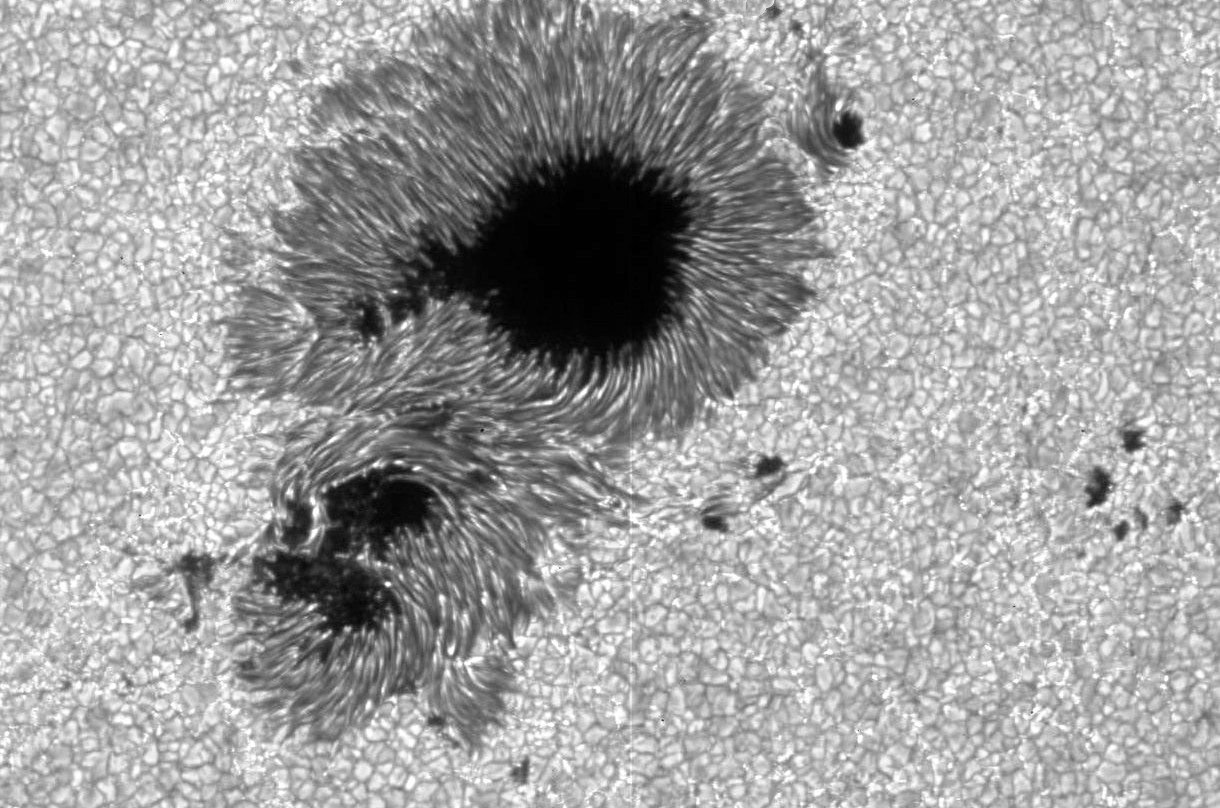
Detailed view of sunspot, 13 December 2006

=== Wind ===
Schematic of Earth's magnetosphere. The solar wind flows from left to right.

Simulation of Earth's magnetic field in interaction with (solar) interplanetary magnetic field that illustrates the dynamical changes of the global magnetic field in the course of a disturbance: a temporary compression of the magnetosphere by enhanced flow of the solar wind is followed by a tailward stretching of the field lines.

The solar wind is a stream of plasma released from the Sun's upper atmosphere. It consists of mostly electrons and protons with energies usually between 1.5 and 10 keV. The stream of particles varies in density, temperature and speed over time and over solar longitude. These particles can escape the Sun's gravity because of their high energy.

The solar wind is divided into the slow solar wind and the fast solar wind. The slow solar wind has a velocity of about 400 kilometres per second (250 mi/s), a temperature of 2×10^{5} K and a composition that is a close match to the corona. The fast solar wind has a typical velocity of 750 km/s, a temperature of 8×10^{5} K and nearly matches the photosphere's. The slow solar wind is twice as dense and more variable in intensity than the fast solar wind. The slow wind has a more complex structure, with turbulent regions and large-scale organization.

Both the fast and slow solar winds can be interrupted by large, fast-moving bursts of plasma called interplanetary CMEs, or ICMEs. They cause shock waves in the thin plasma of the heliosphere, generating electromagnetic waves and accelerating particles (mostly protons and electrons) to form showers of ionizing radiation that precede the CME.

== Effects ==
=== Space weather ===
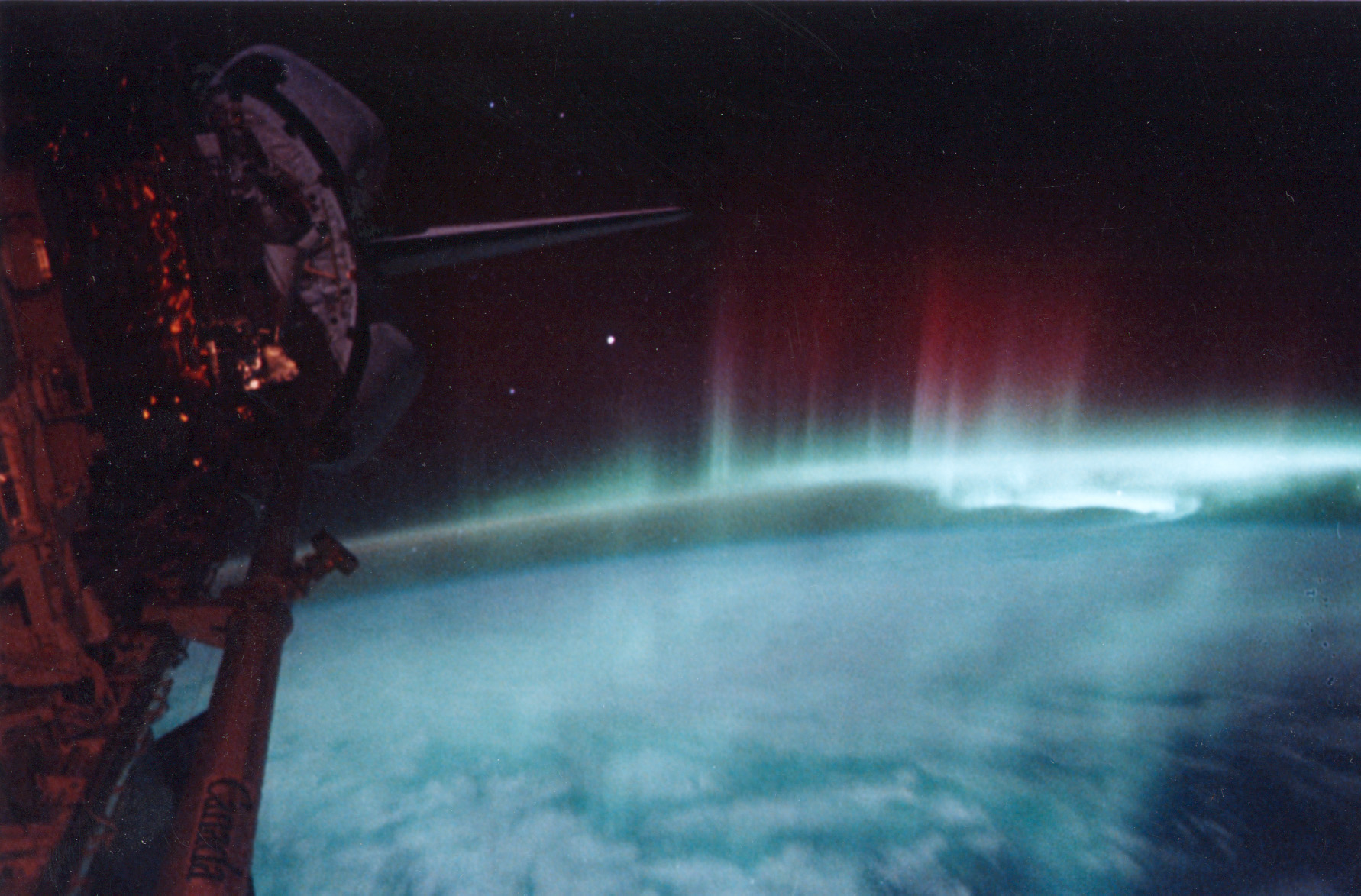
An example of space weather: Aurora australis in the Earth's atmosphere observed by Space Shuttle Discovery, May 1991

Space weather is the environmental condition within the Solar System, including the solar wind. It is studied especially surrounding the Earth, including conditions from the magnetosphere to the ionosphere and thermosphere. Space weather is distinct from terrestrial weather of the troposphere and stratosphere. The term was not used until the 1990s. Prior to that time, such phenomena were considered to be part of physics or aeronomy.

==== Solar storms ====
Solar storms are caused by disturbances on the Sun, most often coronal clouds associated with solar flare CMEs emanating from active sunspot regions, or less often from coronal holes. The Sun can produce intense geomagnetic and proton storms capable of causing power outages, disruption or communications blackouts (including GPS systems) and temporary/permanent disabling of satellites and other spaceborne technology. Solar storms may be hazardous to high-latitude, high-altitude aviation and to human spaceflight. Geomagnetic storms cause aurorae.

The most significant known solar storm occurred in September 1859 and is known as the Carrington Event.

==== Aurora ====
An aurora is a natural light display in the sky, especially in the high latitude (Arctic and Antarctic) regions, in the form of a large circle around the pole. It is caused by the collision of solar wind and charged magnetospheric particles with the high altitude atmosphere (thermosphere).

Most auroras occur in a band known as the auroral zone, which is typically 3° to 6° wide in latitude and observed at 10° to 20° from the geomagnetic poles at all longitudes, but often most vividly around the spring and autumn equinoxes. The charged particles and solar wind are directed into the atmosphere by the Earth's magnetosphere. A geomagnetic storm expands the auroral zone to lower latitudes.

Auroras are associated with the solar wind. The Earth's magnetic field traps its particles, many of which travel toward the poles where they are accelerated toward Earth. Collisions between these ions and the atmosphere release energy in the form of auroras appearing in large circles around the poles. Auroras are more frequent and brighter during the solar cycle's intense phase when CMEs increase the intensity of the solar wind.

==== Geomagnetic storm ====
A geomagnetic storm is a temporary disturbance of the Earth's magnetosphere caused by a solar wind shock wave and/or cloud of magnetic field that interacts with the Earth's magnetic field. The increase in solar wind pressure compresses the magnetosphere and the solar wind's magnetic field interacts with the Earth's magnetic field to transfer increased energy into the magnetosphere. Both interactions increase plasma movement through the magnetosphere (driven by increased electric fields) and increase the electric current in the magnetosphere and ionosphere.

The disturbance in the interplanetary medium that drives a storm may be due to a CME or a high speed stream (co-rotating interaction region or CIR) of the solar wind originating from a region of weak magnetic field on the solar surface. The frequency of geomagnetic storms increases and decreases with the sunspot cycle. CME driven storms are more common during the solar maximum of the solar cycle, while CIR-driven storms are more common during the solar minimum.

Several space weather phenomena are associated with geomagnetic storms. These include Solar Energetic Particle (SEP) events, geomagnetically induced currents (GIC), ionospheric disturbances that cause radio and radar scintillation, disruption of compass navigation and auroral displays at much lower latitudes than normal. A 1989 geomagnetic storm energized ground induced currents that disrupted electric power distribution throughout most of the province of Quebec and caused aurorae as far south as Texas.

==== Sudden ionospheric disturbance ====
A sudden ionospheric disturbance (SID) is an abnormally high ionization/plasma density in the D region of the ionosphere caused by a solar flare. The SID results in a sudden increase in radio-wave absorption that is most severe in the upper medium frequency (MF) and lower high frequency (HF) ranges, and as a result, often interrupts or interferes with telecommunications systems.

==== Geomagnetically induced currents ====
Geomagnetically induced currents are a manifestation at ground level of space weather, which affect the normal operation of long electrical conductor systems. During space weather events, electric currents in the magnetosphere and ionosphere experience large variations, which manifest also in the Earth's magnetic field. These variations induce currents (GIC) in earthly conductors. Electric transmission grids and buried pipelines are common examples of such conductor systems. GIC can cause problems such as increased corrosion of pipeline steel and damaged high-voltage power transformers.

=== Carbon-14 ===
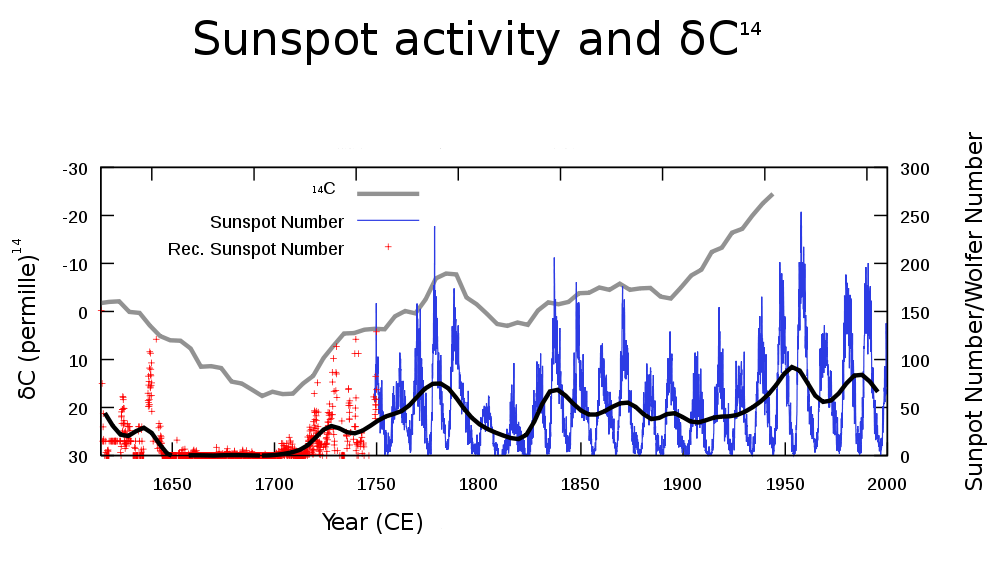
Sunspot record (blue) with ^{14}C (inverted).

The production of carbon-14 (radiocarbon: ^{14}C) is related to solar activity. Carbon-14 is produced in the upper atmosphere when cosmic ray bombardment of atmospheric nitrogen (^{14}N) induces the nitrogen to undergo β+ decay, thus transforming into an unusual isotope of carbon with an atomic weight of 14 rather than the more common 12. Because galactic cosmic rays are partially excluded from the Solar System by the outward sweep of magnetic fields in the solar wind, increased solar activity reduces ^{14}C production.

Atmospheric ^{14}C concentration is lower during solar maxima and higher during solar minima. By measuring the captured ^{14}C in wood and counting tree rings, production of radiocarbon relative to recent wood can be measured and dated. A reconstruction of the past 10,000 years shows that the ^{14}C production was much higher during the mid-Holocene 7,000 years ago and decreased until 1,000 years ago. In addition to variations in solar activity, long-term trends in carbon-14 production are influenced by changes in the Earth's geomagnetic field and by changes in carbon cycling within the biosphere (particularly those associated with changes in the extent of vegetation between ice ages).

== Observation history ==
Solar activity and related events have been regularly recorded since the time of the Babylonians. Early records described solar eclipses, the corona and sunspots.

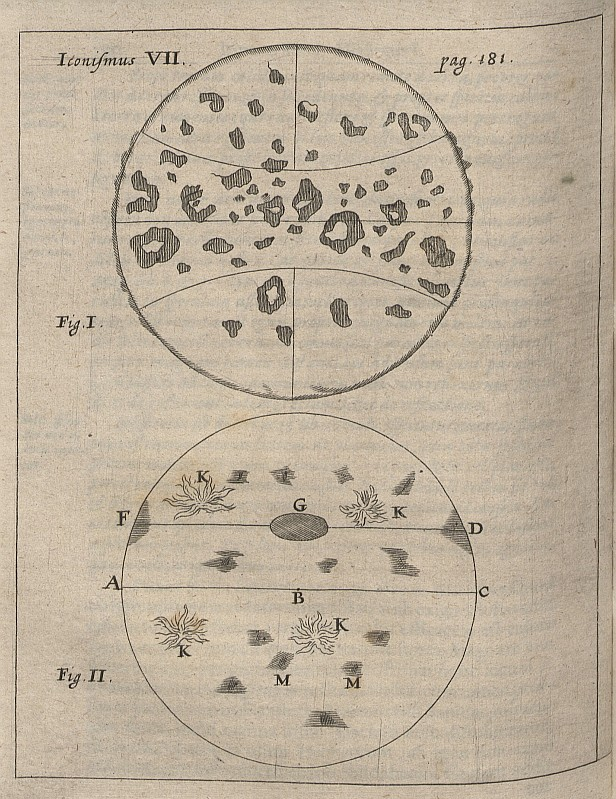
Illustration of sunspots drawn by 17th-century German Jesuit scholar Athanasius Kircher

Soon after the invention of telescopes, in the early 1600s, astronomers began observing the Sun. Thomas Harriot was the first to observe sunspots, in 1610. Observers confirmed the less-frequent sunspots and aurorae during the Maunder minimum. One of these observers was the renowned astronomer Johannes Hevelius who recorded a number of sunspots from 1653 to 1679 in the early Maunder minimum, listed in the book Machina Coelestis (1679).

Solar spectrometry began in 1817. Rudolf Wolf gathered sunspot observations as far back as the 1755–1766 cycle. He established a relative sunspot number formulation (the Wolf or Zürich sunspot number) that became the standard measure. Around 1852, Sabine, Wolf, Gautier and von Lamont independently found a link between the solar cycle and geomagnetic activity.

On 2 April 1845, Fizeau and Foucault first photographed the Sun. Photography assisted in the study of solar prominences, granulation, spectroscopy and solar eclipses.

On 1 September 1859, Richard C. Carrington and separately R. Hodgson first observed a solar flare. Carrington and Gustav Spörer discovered that the Sun exhibits differential rotation, and that the outer layer must be fluid.

In 1907–08, George Ellery Hale uncovered the Sun's magnetic cycle and the magnetic nature of sunspots. Hale and his colleagues later deduced Hale's polarity laws that described its magnetic field.

Bernard Lyot's 1931 invention of the coronagraph allowed the corona to be studied in full daylight.

The Sun was, until the 1990s, the only star whose surface had been resolved. Other major achievements included understanding of:

- X-ray-emitting loops (e.g., by Yohkoh)
- Corona and solar wind (e.g., by SoHO)
- Variance of solar brightness with level of activity, and verification of this effect in other solar-type stars (e.g., by ACRIM)
- The intense fibril state of the magnetic fields at the visible surface of a star like the Sun (e.g., by Hinode)
- The presence of magnetic fields of 0.5×10^{5} to 1×10^{5} gauss at the base of the conductive zone, presumably in some fibril form, inferred from the dynamics of rising azimuthal flux bundles.
- Low-level electron neutrino emission from the Sun's core.

In the later twentieth century, satellites began observing the Sun, providing many insights. For example, modulation of solar luminosity by magnetically active regions was confirmed by satellite measurements of total solar irradiance (TSI) by the ACRIM1 experiment on the Solar Maximum Mission (launched in 1980).

== See also ==
- Attribution of recent climate change (section Solar activity)
- Climate change (section Solar output)
- Outline of astronomy
- Radiative levitation
- Solar cycle
