= Homeric Minimum =

Solar minimum that took place between 800 and 600 BC

The Homeric Minimum is a grand solar minimum that started about ca. 800 BC and lasted around 200 years. It appears to coincide with, and have been the cause of, a phase of climate change at that time, which involved a wetter Western Europe and drier eastern Europe. This had far-reaching effects on human civilization, some of which may be recorded in Greek mythology and the Old Testament.

== Solar phenomenon ==
The Homeric Minimum is a persistent and deep grand solar minimum between about 800 and 600 BC. Cosmogenic beryllium-10 deposits in varves in a German lake show a sharp increase "2,759 ± 39 varve years before present", while carbon-14 is high starting around 830 BC. It is similar to the Spörer Minimum of around AD 1500. It is sometimes named the "Great Solar Minimum" or Homerian GSM. It has been subdivided into a stronger minimum at 2,750-2,635 years before present and a secondary minimum 2,614-2,594 years before present. The Homeric Minimum is sometimes considered to be part of a longer "Hallstattzeit" solar minimum between 705 and 200 BC that also includes a second minimum between 460 and 260 BC. The Homeric Minimum however also coincided with a geomagnetic excursion named "Etrussia-Sterno", which may have altered the climate response to the Homeric Minimum. The name "Homeric Minimum" however is not widely accepted in solar physics.

== Mechanisms of climate effects ==
Variations in the solar output have effects on climate, less through the usually quite small effects on insolation and more through the relatively large changes of UV radiation and potentially also indirectly through modulation of cosmic ray radiation. The 11-year solar cycle measurably alters the behaviour of weather and atmosphere, but decadal and centennial climate cycles are also attributed to solar variation. Any direct radiation effects may have been further amplified by oceanic circulation changes, such as the El Niño-Southern Oscillation and the Atlantic Meridional Overturning Circulation. It is possible that cooling in the North Atlantic predated the Homeric Minimum, while the timing of East Asian Summer Monsoon changes coincides well with that of the Homeric Minimum.

== Effects on human populations and climate ==
Debates on whether a climatic deterioration occurred during that time began already in the late 19th century. The Homeric Minimum has been linked with a phase of climate change known as the Homeric Climate Anomaly or Homeric Climate Oscillation, during which western North America and Europe became colder but whether it became drier or wetter is under debate; the western parts and the North Atlantic may have become wetter and the eastern parts of Europe drier. This climate oscillation has been called the "Homeric Climate Oscillation", "850 BC event" or the "2.8 kyr event", and it has been associated with the Iron Age Cold Epoch. Historical events possibly linked to it are the decline of the Urartu kingdom in Armenia and of the Western Zhou dynasty in China, the depopulation of Ustica in the Mediterranean and a cultural interruption in Ireland although its effect there is still debated.

Human cultures at that time underwent changes, which also coincide with the transition from the Bronze Age to the Iron Age. The climate fallout of this prolonged solar minimum may have had substantial impact on human societies at that time, with adaptations to changed climates, and a recovery of societies after its end. Increased precipitation in Thrace and over the Eurasian steppes during the Homeric Minimum may have benefitted the founding of Byzantium and the Skythians, respectively, however, and a cultural change in the Eurasian Koban culture has been associated with the Homeric Minimum.

It has been speculated that some ancient literary references refer to these phenomena. For example, the period saw the growth of a glacier on Mount Olympus, while Greek mythology and Homer refer to ice and storms on the mountain, which may also be reflected in the name "Olympus". Increased activity of the polar lights at the end of the Homeric Minimum may have inspired Ezekiel's vision of God in the Old Testament.

a stormy wind ... out of the north ... with brightness around it, and fire flashing forth ... as it were gleaming metal ... an expanse, shining like awe-inspiring crystal.

— Ezekiel, Book of Ezekiel (Ezekiel 1:4–28, ESV), Old Testament

== Other effects ==
A variety of phenomena have been linked to the Homeric Minimum:

- Increasingly cold, wet and windy climate recorded from Meerfelder Maar in Germany, where the Homeric Minimum has been associated with a permanent climate transition. A wetter climate was also recognized in a bog in the Netherlands; the present-day Czech Republic, where it also became colder; and in the British Isles.
- A growth in the size of lakes and downward expansion of conifer forests took place in Western North America at the time of the Homeric Minimum.
- Decreased sea levels are recorded from the Homeric Minimum.
- Increased storminess in Scotland, England and Sweden.
- Increased precipitation in northern Iberia. Such a precipitation increase took place a few decades after the Homeric Minimum and increased wetness has been noted after other solar minima, as well.
- Cold sea surface temperatures in the Santa Barbara Basin of California and a cold interval in the Campito Mountain tree ring record. The Homeric Minimum in general seems to be associated with a cold climate in California.
- Decreased atmospheric pressure differences between Iceland and the subtropics, that is a decreased North Atlantic oscillation index which lasted past the end of the Homeric Minimum.
- Cooling is also recorded from Asia and the Southern Hemisphere.
- Increased windiness is recorded in lakes of Western Europe.
- Gustier springs in Europe and increased cold air outbreaks in East Asia.
- Groundwater levels rose in the Netherlands.
- A weaker monsoon in East Asia, India and Tibet.
- A northern drought-southern flood climate response in China.
- A wetter climate is recorded for Central Asia.
- Lake levels in the Caspian Sea rose.
- Water levels increased in lakes of the French Jura.
- Cooling in the Ionian Sea and around the Sea of Okhotsk.
- More frequent floods and storms in the Alps.
- A dry period in the Eastern Mediterranean, such as at Jerusalem, Lake Van and the Dead Sea appears to coincide with the Homeric Minimum, although the mechanisms for this are not clear.
- Expansion of glaciers in the Caucasus.
- A cold and arid climate in Armenia.
- Increased incision along the River Soar.
- Increased flooding along the Ammer river.
- Increased production of carbon-14 and beryllium-10 by cosmic rays, recorded in Greenland. The carbon-14 excursion is also recorded elsewhere and constitutes the largest such spike since 2000 BCE, exceeding the Maunder Minimum. The so-called Hallstatt plateau, an anomaly in carbon-14 production that creates large imprecisions in radiocarbon dating during that time, has been related to the Homeric Minimum.
- The switch from the Subboreal to the Subatlantic climate epoch in the Blytt–Sernander sequence about 2,800 years before present.
- The "Göschenen I" glacier advance in the Alps relates to the Homeric Minimum.
- A change in storm frequency on the Scotian Shelf.
- Increased precipitation in Sicily.
- The Bond event 2 is associated with the 2.8 ka event.
- Cold and dry weather in China is recorded in historical records like the Bamboo Annals.
- A colder climate in the Khingan Mountains of China.
- Increased runoff in Corsica.
- Increased El Niño-Southern Oscillation events.
