= Astrostatistics =

Branch of statistics combining astrophysics, statistical analysis and data mining

Astrostatistics is a discipline which spans astrophysics, statistical analysis and data mining. It is used to process the vast amount of data produced by automated scanning of the cosmos, to characterize complex datasets, and to link astronomical data to astrophysical theory. Many branches of statistics are involved in astronomical analysis including nonparametrics, multivariate regression and multivariate classification, time series analysis, and especially Bayesian inference. The field is closely related to astroinformatics.
