= Bastille Day solar storm =

Solar storm on 14–16 July 2000

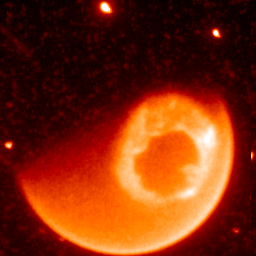
- IMAGE ultraviolet image of the Aurora Borealis on 15 July 2000

Associated solar active region
- NOAA region no.: 9077
- Largest SXR flares: X5.7

G5 "Extreme" geomagnetic storm
- G-scale (NOAA/SWPC)
- Initial onset: 14 July 2000
- Dissipated: 16 July 2000
- Highest K_{p}-index: 9
- Highest A_{p}-index: 164
- Lowest Dst: −301 nT
- Impacts: Minor satellite and terrestrial power transformer damage

The Bastille Day solar storm was a powerful solar storm on 14–16 July 2000 during the solar maximum of solar cycle 23. The storm began on the national day of France, Bastille Day. It involved a solar flare, a solar particle event, and a coronal mass ejection which caused a severe geomagnetic storm.

== Overview ==
=== Solar flare and particle event ===
On 14 July 2000 from about 10:03 to 10:43 UTC, GOES satellites detected a very strong, X5.7-class solar flare (Note: The label X5.7-class implies that the solar flare had a peak soft X-ray flux of 5.7×10^{−3} W/m^{2} in the 0.1 to 0.8 nm (1 to 8 Å) passband. (See Solar flare § Soft X-ray classification.)) which peaked in soft X-ray intensity at around 10:24 UTC. This flare originated from the solar active region AR9077 which was located near the center of the Sun's disk (N22 W02) at the time of the flare.

Starting at around 10:41 UTC, GOES satellites began detecting a strong, S3, solar particle event (Note: The label S3 is assigned to solar particle events which have a flux of protons with energies ≥10 MeV peaking between 10^{3} and 10^{4} proton flux units (or particle cm^{−2} s^{−1} sr^{−1}).) associated with the ongoing X5.7-class flare. This resulted in high energy protons penetrating and ionizing parts of the Earth's ionosphere and creating noise in various satellite imaging systems such as in the EIT and LASCO instruments. Some of these particles had sufficient energy to generate effects measured on Earth's surface, an event referred to as a ground level enhancement. Although the flare was not extremely large, the associated solar particle event was the fourth largest since 1967.

=== Geomagnetic storm ===
The detection of the solar flare was also followed by the detection of a halo, or Earth-directed, coronal mass ejection (CME) in coronagraph data starting at 10:54 UTC. This CME reached Earth on 15 July causing a geomagnetic storm on 15–16 July which would reach a peak Kp index of 9 in the late hours of 15 July corresponding to an extreme-level, or G5, geomagnetic storm (Note: The label G5 is assigned to geomagnetic storms which reach a peak Kp index of 9 or more. (See K-index § G-scale.)) and register a peak Dst of −301 nT. The storm caused minor damage to power transformers and satellites. It was also one of only three solar storms having registered a maximum Kp of 9 since the March 1989 geomagnetic storm, the others being the 2003 Halloween solar storms and the May 2024 solar storms.

== Aftermath ==
Due to being the first major solar storm since the launch of various solar-monitoring satellites, the Bastille Day event proved important towards helping scientists piece together a general theory of how eruptions on the sun occur as well as protecting the Earth from a larger event, such as a Carrington-class event, some day in the future.

Despite their great distance from the Sun, the Bastille Day event was observed by Voyager 1 and Voyager 2.

== See also ==
- List of solar storms
