= March 1989 geomagnetic storm =

Extreme space-weather event

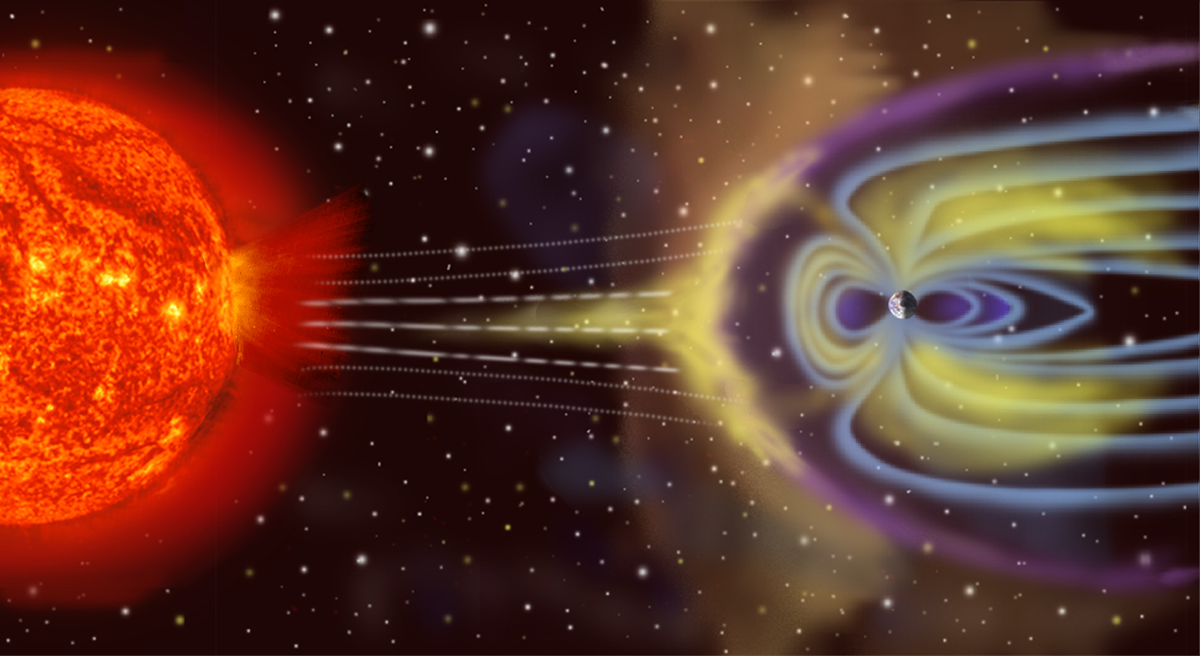
- Artist's depiction of solar wind striking Earth's magnetosphere (size and distance not to scale)

Associated solar active region
- NOAA region no.: 5395
- Largest SXR flares: X15

Geomagnetic storm
- Initial onset: 9 March 1989
- Dissipated: 13 March 1989
- Highest K_{p}-index: 9
- Highest A_{p}-index: 246
- Lowest Dst: −589 nT
- Impacts: Global communications blackouts; loss of power to the Hydro-Québec power grid

The March 1989 geomagnetic storm occurred as part of severe to extreme solar storms during early to middle March 1989, the most notable being a geomagnetic storm that struck Earth on March 13. This geomagnetic storm caused a nine-hour outage of Hydro-Québec's electricity transmission system. The onset time was exceptionally rapid. Other historically significant solar storms occurred later in 1989, during a very active period of solar cycle 22.

== Geomagnetic storm and auroras ==
The geomagnetic storm causing this event is believed to be the result of two separate events known as coronal mass ejections (CME) on March 10 and 12, 1989. A few days before, on March 6, a very large X15-class solar flare also occurred. Several days later, at 01:27 UT on March 13, a severe geomagnetic storm struck Earth. The storm began on Earth with extremely intense auroras at the poles. The aurora could be seen as far south as Texas and Florida. As this occurred during the Cold War, some people worried that a nuclear first strike might be in progress. Others incorrectly considered the intense auroras to be associated with the Space Shuttle mission STS-29, which had been launched on March 13 at 9:57:00 a.m.

The storm caused significant interference to the United States power grid.

Substantial communications blackouts occurred. The burst caused shortwave radio interference, including the disruption of radio signals from Radio Free Europe into Russia. It was initially believed that the signals had been jammed by the Soviet government. As midnight came and went, a mass of charged particles and electrons in the ionosphere flowed from west to east, inducing powerful electrical currents in the ground.

Some satellites in polar orbits lost control for several hours. GOES weather satellite communications were interrupted, causing weather images to be lost. NASA's TDRS-1 communication satellite recorded over 250 anomalies caused by the increased particles flowing into its sensitive electronics. The Space Shuttle Discovery was aloft at the time and suffered a sensor malfunction: a sensor on one of the tanks supplying hydrogen to a fuel cell showed unusually high pressure readings on March 13. The problem went away after the solar storm subsided.

== Quebec power blackout ==
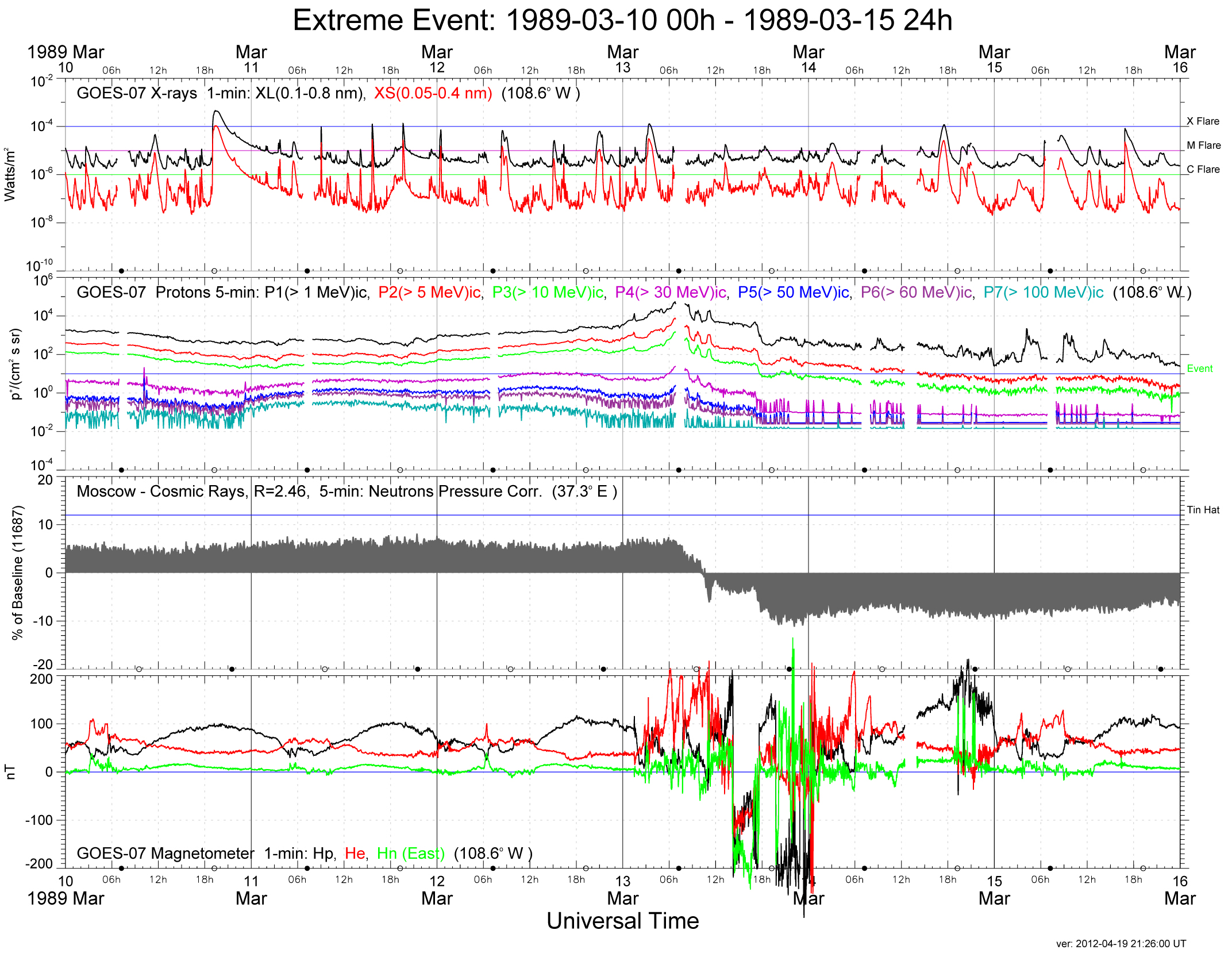
GOES-7 monitors the space weather conditions during the Great Geomagnetic storm of March 1989; the Moscow neutron monitor recorded the passage of a CME as a drop in levels known as a Forbush decrease.

The variations in the Earth's magnetic field tripped circuit breakers on Hydro-Québec's power grid. The utility's very long transmission lines and the fact that most of Quebec sits on a large rock shield prevented current flowing through the earth, finding a less resistant path along the 735 kV power lines.

The James Bay network went offline in less than 90 seconds, giving Quebec its second massive power outage in 11 months. The power failure lasted nine hours and forced the company to implement various mitigation strategies, including raising the trip level, installing series compensation on ultra high voltage lines and upgrading various monitoring and operational procedures. Other utilities in North America and Northern Europe and elsewhere implemented programs to reduce the risks associated with geomagnetically induced currents (GICs).

== Military ==
One of the few publicly reported military operations impacted was the Australian Army component of the United Nations (UN) peacekeeping force which was deployed to Namibia at the time. The storm occurred just as the advance elements of the contingent arrived in Namibia, but the effects were believed to last for weeks afterwards. The Australian contribution to UNTAG was heavily reliant on high frequency (HF) radio communications which were severely impacted.

== Aftermath ==
On August 16, 1989, another storm caused a halt of all trading on the Toronto Stock Exchange when three redundant disc drives all failed.

Since 1996, geomagnetic storms and solar flares have been monitored from the Solar and Heliospheric Observatory (SOHO) satellite, a joint project of NASA and the European Space Agency (ESA). Extreme geomagnetic storms were registered in 2003 and 2024, both sparking northern lights as far south as Florida.

Because of serious concerns that utilities have failed to set protection standards and are unprepared for a severe solar storm such as the 1859 Carrington Event, in 2013, the Federal Energy Regulatory Commission (FERC) ordered the North American Electric Reliability Corporation (NERC) to create standards that would require power grids to be somewhat protected from solar storms and equipment to be continuously tested for possible effects of solar storms. After a technical conference and public comment, the final rule utilities must use for testing equipment and directing future research was published in September, 2016.

The 2011 Fukushima nuclear accident prompted the Nuclear Regulatory Commission to examine the sufficiency of cooling systems of stored spent fuel rods of nuclear power plants now considered vulnerable to long-term power outages, which could also be caused by space weather, high-altitude nuclear burst electromagnetic pulses (EMPs), or cyber attacks.

== See also ==
- Active region
- Geomagnetic excursion
- List of solar storms
- May 1921 geomagnetic storm
