= List of solar storms =

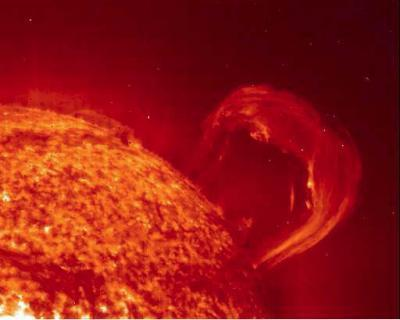
A solar prominence eruption

Solar storms of different types are caused by disturbances on the Sun, most often from coronal mass ejections (CMEs) and solar flares from active regions, or, less often, from coronal holes. Minor to active solar storms (i.e., storming restricted to higher latitudes) may occur under elevated background solar wind conditions when the interplanetary magnetic field (IMF) orientation is southward, toward the Earth (which also leads to much stronger storming conditions from CME-related sources).

== Background ==
Active stars produce disturbances in space weather and, if strong enough, in their own space climate. Science studies such phenomena with the field of heliophysics, which is an interdisciplinary combination of solar physics and planetary science.

In the Solar System, the Sun can produce intense geomagnetic and energetic particle storms capable of causing severe damage to technology. It can result in large scale power outages, disruption or blackouts of radio communications (including GPS), damage or destruction of submarine communications cables, and temporary to permanent disabling of satellites and other electronics. Intense solar storms may also be hazardous to high-latitude, high-altitude aviation and to human spaceflight. Geomagnetic storms are the cause of aurora. The most significant known solar storm, across the most parameters, occurred in September 1859 and is known as the "Carrington event". The damage from the most potent solar storms is capable of existentially threatening the stability of modern human civilization, although proper preparedness and mitigation can substantially reduce the hazards. Steeply increasing satellite congestion primarily due to megaconstellations is severely increasing the risk of collisions and of reaching hazardous stages of the Kessler syndrome, with a solar storm that disables avoidance measures as a potential precipitating event.

Proxy data from Earth, as well as analysis of stars similar to the Sun, suggest that the Sun may be also capable of producing so-called "superflares", which are as much as 1,000 times stronger than any flares in the historical record. Other research, like models of solar flares and statistics of extreme solar events reconstructed using cosmogenic isotope data in terrestrial archives, indicate otherwise. The discrepancy is not yet resolved and may be related to a biased statistic of the stellar population of solar analogs.

The higher occurrence of large solar storms during September and March, near the equinoxes, can be explained by the Russell–McPherron effect.

== Coronal mass ejections and solar particle events ==
=== Events affecting Earth ===
==== Proxy evidence ====
This section contains a list of possible events that are indicated by indirect, or proxy data. The scientific value of such data remains unresolved.

- 12351–12350 BCE Probable Miyake event, which would be the largest known and twice the 774–775 event.
- 7176 BCE Found in beryllium-10 (and other isotopes) spike in ice cores and corroborated by tree rings. It unexpectedly appears to have occurred near a solar minimum and was as strong as, or probably even slightly stronger than the famous 774–775 CE event.
- c. 5410 BCE
- 5259 BCE Found in beryllium-10 spike in ice cores and corroborated by tree rings. At least as strong as the 774–775 event.
- c. 660 BCE
- 774–775 CE This extreme solar proton event is the first identified Miyake event. It caused the largest and most rapid rise in carbon-14 levels ever recorded.
- 993–994 CE It caused a carbon-14 spike visible in tree rings which was used to date Viking archaeological remains in L'Anse aux Meadows in Newfoundland to 1021.
- 1052 CE found in carbon-14 spike
- 1204 CE found in carbon-14 spike and noted in contemporary records
- 1279 CE found in carbon-14 spike

==== Direct measurements and/or visual observations ====
Date	Event	Significance
Mar 1582	Great magnetic storms of March 1582	Prolonged severe-extreme geomagnetic storm produced aurora to 28.8° magnetic latitude (MLAT) and ≈33.0° invariant latitude (ILAT).
Feb 1730		At least as intense as the 1989 event but less intense than the Carrington event
Sep 1770		
Sep 1859	Carrington Event	The most extreme storm ever documented by most measures; telegraph machines reportedly shocked operators and caused small fires; aurorae visible in tropical areas; first solidly established connection of flares to geomagnetic disturbances. Extreme storming directly preceded this event in late August.
Oct 1870	October 1870 geomagnetic storm	Auroras in low-latitude cities like Athens, Baghdad, Cairo, Lisbon, New York and Tbilisi have been observed 24–25 Oct 1870. The amplitude of measured horizontal fluctuation of the geomagnetic field was 281 nano-teslas (nT)
Feb 1872	Chapman–Silverman storm	Minimal Disturbance storm time index (Dst)* ≤ −834 nano-teslas (nT)
Nov 1882	November 1882 geomagnetic storm	Comparable in size to the May 2024 storms.
Oct 1903	Solar storm of Oct-Nov 1903	An extreme storm, estimated at Dst −531 nT arose from a fast CME (mean ≈1500 km/s), occurred during the ascending phase of the minimum of the relatively weak solar cycle 14, which is the most significant storm on record in a solar minimum period. Aurora was conservatively observed to ≈44.1° ILAT, and widespread disruptions and overcharging of telegraph systems occurred.
Sep 1909	Geomagnetic storm of September 1909	Dst calculated to have reached −595 nT, comparable to the March 1989 event
May 1921	May 1921 geomagnetic storm	Among most extreme known geomagnetic storms; farthest equatorward (lowest latitude) aurora ever documented; burned out fuses, electrical apparatus, and telephone station; caused fires at signal tower and telegraph station; total communications blackouts lasting several hours. A paper in 2019 estimates a peak Dst of −907±132 nT.
Jan 1938	January 1938 geomagnetic storm, or the Fátima storm	A series of intense geomagnetic storms during the month of January 1938. Most powerful (25-26) comparible in intensity to the Oct 2024 storm, caused auroras across Europe.
Mar 1940	March 1940 superstorm	Triggered by an X35±1 solar flare. Caused significant interference to United States communication systems.
Sep 1941		
Mar 1946	Geomagnetic storm of March 1946	Est. Dst_{m} of −512 nT
Feb 1956		
Sep 1957	Geomagnetic storm of September 1957	
Feb 1958	Geomagnetic storm of February 1958	
Jul 1959	Geomagnetic storm of July 1959	
May 1967		Blackout of polar surveillance radars during Cold War led U.S. military to scramble for nuclear war until solar origin confirmed
Oct 1968		
Aug 1972	August 1972 solar storms	Fastest CME transit time recorded; most extreme solar particle event (SPE) by some measures and the most hazardous to human spaceflight during the Space Age; severe technological disruptions, caused accidental detonation of numerous magnetic-influence sea mines
Mar 1989	March 1989 geomagnetic storm	Most extreme storm of the Space Age by several measures. Outed power grid of province of Quebec. Caused interference to United States power grid. 2024 study estimated Dst_{m} of −750 nT.
Aug 1989		
Nov 1991	Geomagnetic storm of November 1991	An intense solar storm with about half the energy output of the March 1989 storm. Aurorae were visible in the US as far south as Texas
Apr 2000		
Jul 2000	Bastille Day solar storm	Caused by an X8-class solar flare aimed directly at Earth
Apr 2001		A solar flare from a sunspot region associated with this activity and preceding this period produced the then largest flare detected during the Space Age at about X20 (the first event to saturate spaceborne monitoring instruments, this was exceeded in 2003) but was directed away from Earth.
Nov 2001	Geomagnetic storm of November 2001	A fast-moving CME triggered vivid aurorae as far south as Texas, California, and Florida
Oct 2003	2003 Halloween solar storms	Among top few most intense storms of the Space Age; aurora visible as far south as Texas and the Mediterranean countries of Europe. A solar flare with X-ray flux estimated to be around X45 occurred from an associated active region on 4 November but was directed away from Earth.
Nov 2003	Solar storms of November 2003	2021 study estimated Dst_{m} of −533 nT. 2024 study estimated Dst of −490 nT
Jan 2005		The most intense solar flare in 15 years with sunspot 720 erupting, 5 times from January 15 to 20.
Mar 2015	St. Patrick's Day storm	Largest geomagnetic storm of solar cycle 24, driven by interplanetary magnetic field (IMF) variations
Sep 2017		Triggered by an X13 class solar flare
Feb 2022	SpaceX Starlink satellites failure	A mild solar particle and geomagnetic storm of otherwise little consequence led to the premature reentry and destruction of 40 SpaceX Starlink satellites launched February 3, 2022 due to increased atmospheric drag.
30 April – 12 May 2024	May 2024 solar storms	X1.2(X1.3)-class flares and X4.5-class flare. The flares with a magnitude of 6–7 occurred between 30 April and 4 May 2024. On 5 May the strength of the solar storm reached 5 points, which is considered strong according to the K-index. The rapidly growing sunspot AR3663 became the most active spot of the solar cycle 25. On 5 May alone, it emitted two X-class (strongest) flares and six M-class (medium) flares. Each of these flares resulted in a short-term but profound disconnection of the Earth's radio signal, resulting in signal loss at frequencies below 30 megahertz (MHz). An extreme (G5) geomagnetic storm alert was issued by the National Oceanic and Atmospheric Administration (NOAA) – the first in almost 20 years. The final storms reaching the highest level of NOAA's G-scale before solar cycle 25 occurred in 2005 in May, August, and September, respectively. With a NOAA rating of G5, an estimated peak Dst of −412 nT, and aurorae seen at far lower latitudes than usual in both hemispheres, this geomagnetic storm was the most powerful to affect Earth since November 2003. A later study estimates a Dst peak of −518 nT, meaning the strongest storm since 1989 and the second strongest since 1921.
Oct 2024	October 2024 solar storm	Triggered by an X1.8 solar flare that produced a relatively fast CME. The storm reached a peak Dst of −341 nT. A Starlink satellite re-entry occurred prematurely due to increased atmosphere drag.Auroras seen as far south as Cuba.
Nov 2025	November 2025 solar storm	Auroras seen as far south as Central Mexico.
Jan 2026	January 2026 solar storm	Triggered by an X1.9 solar flare that produced an unusually fast CME. An S4 (i.e., severe) solar radiation storm occurred, the strongest since October 1989. Auroras seen as far south as Spain and Arizona. Somewhat similar to the August 1972 storm.
25 June 2026-	June-July 2026 solar storm	G3 Solar Storm caused auroras in 30 U.S. states July 4

=== Events not affecting Earth ===
The above events affected Earth (and its vicinity, known as the magnetosphere), whereas the following events were directed elsewhere in the Solar System and were detected by monitoring spacecraft or other means.

Date(s)	Event	Significance
23 July 2012	July 2012 solar storm	Ultrafast CME directed away from Earth with characteristics that may have made it a Carrington-class storm
1 Sep 2014		Caused a fast CME and a proton event.
23 July 2017		5 years after the 2012 CME.
15 Feb 2022		
21 Oct 2025		

== Soft X-ray solar flares ==
Solar flares are intense localized eruptions of electromagnetic radiation in the Sun's atmosphere. They are often classified based on the peak flux of soft X-rays (SXR) measured by the GOES spacecraft in geosynchronous orbit (see Solar flare § Soft X-ray).

The following table lists the largest flares in this respect since June 1996, the beginning of solar cycle 23.

No.	SXR Class	Date	Solar cycle	Active region	Time (UTC)			Notes
No.	SXR Class	Date	Solar cycle	Active region	Start	Max	End	Notes
1	>X28+	2003-11-04	23	10486	19:29	19:53	20:06	Associated with the 2003 Halloween solar storms
2	X20	2001-04-02	23	9393	21:32	21:51	22:03	
3	X17.2	2003-10-28	23	10486	09:51	11:10	11:24	Associated with the 2003 Halloween solar storms
4	X17	2005-09-07	23	10808	17:17	17:40	18:03	
5	X14.4	2001-04-15	23	9415	13:19	13:50	13:55	
6	X10	2003-10-29	23	10486	20:37	20:49	21:01	Associated with the 2003 Halloween solar storms
7	X9.4	1997-11-06	23	8100	11:49	11:55	12:01	
8	X9.3	2017-09-06	24	12673	11:53	12:02	12:10	
9	X9.0	2006-12-05	23	10930	10:18	10:35	10:45	
10	X8.3	2003-11-02	23	10486	17:03	17:25	17:39	Associated with the 2003 Halloween solar storms

== See also ==
- Earth's magnetic field
- Gamma-ray burst and hypernova
- Health threat from cosmic rays
- Heliosphere
- Solar cycle
- Space physics
- Space Weather Prediction Center (SWPC)
