= 2003 Halloween solar storms =

Series of intense solar storms in 2003

Halloween solar storms, 2003
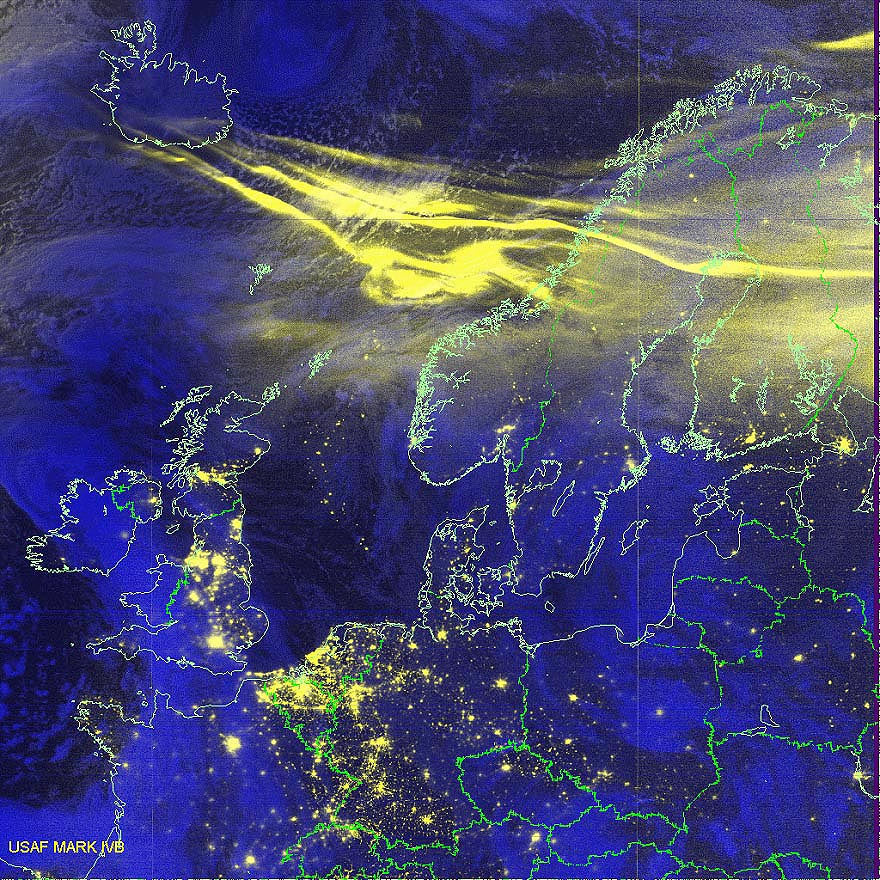
- Composite image showing aurorae over northern Europe, taken by DMSP on October 30, 2003

Associated solar active region
- NOAA region no.: 10486
- Largest SXR flares: X40+

G5 "Extreme" geomagnetic storm
- G-scale (NOAA/SWPC)
- Initial onset: October 2003
- Dissipated: November 2003
- Highest K_{p}-index: 9
- Highest A_{p}-index: 204
- Lowest Dst: −383 nT
- Impacts: Electrical faults and wear to various satellites; satellite communications blackouts; localized power outage in Sweden

The Halloween solar storms were a series of solar storms involving solar flares and coronal mass ejections that occurred from mid-October to early November 2003, peaking around October 28–29. This series of storms generated the largest solar flare ever recorded by the GOES system, modeled as strong as X45 (initially estimated at X28 due to saturation of GOES' detectors).

== Effects ==
=== On Earth ===
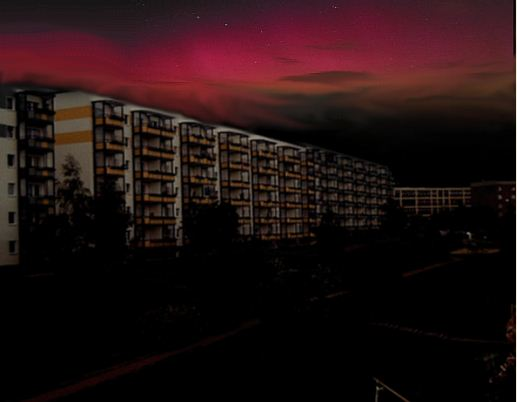
Aurora as seen from Jena, Germany (51°N)

Satellite-based systems and communications were affected, aircraft were advised to avoid high altitudes near the polar regions, and a one-hour-long power outage occurred in Sweden as a result of the solar activity. Aurorae were observed at latitudes as far south as Texas and the Mediterranean countries of Europe. Twelve transformers in South Africa were disabled and had to be replaced, despite the country's low geomagnetic latitude.

=== On satellites and spacecraft ===
The SOHO satellite failed temporarily and the Advanced Composition Explorer (ACE) was damaged by the solar activity. Numerous other spacecraft were damaged or experienced downtime due to various issues. Some of them were intentionally put into safe mode in order to protect sensitive equipment. Astronauts aboard the International Space Station (ISS) had to stay inside the more shielded parts of the Russian Orbital Segment to protect themselves against the increased radiation levels.

Emissions from the CME were later observed by the Mars Odyssey spacecraft orbiting Mars, Ulysses spacecraft near Jupiter, and the Cassini spacecraft en route to Saturn. In April 2004, Voyager 2 was also able to detect them as they reached the spacecraft.

== Analysis ==
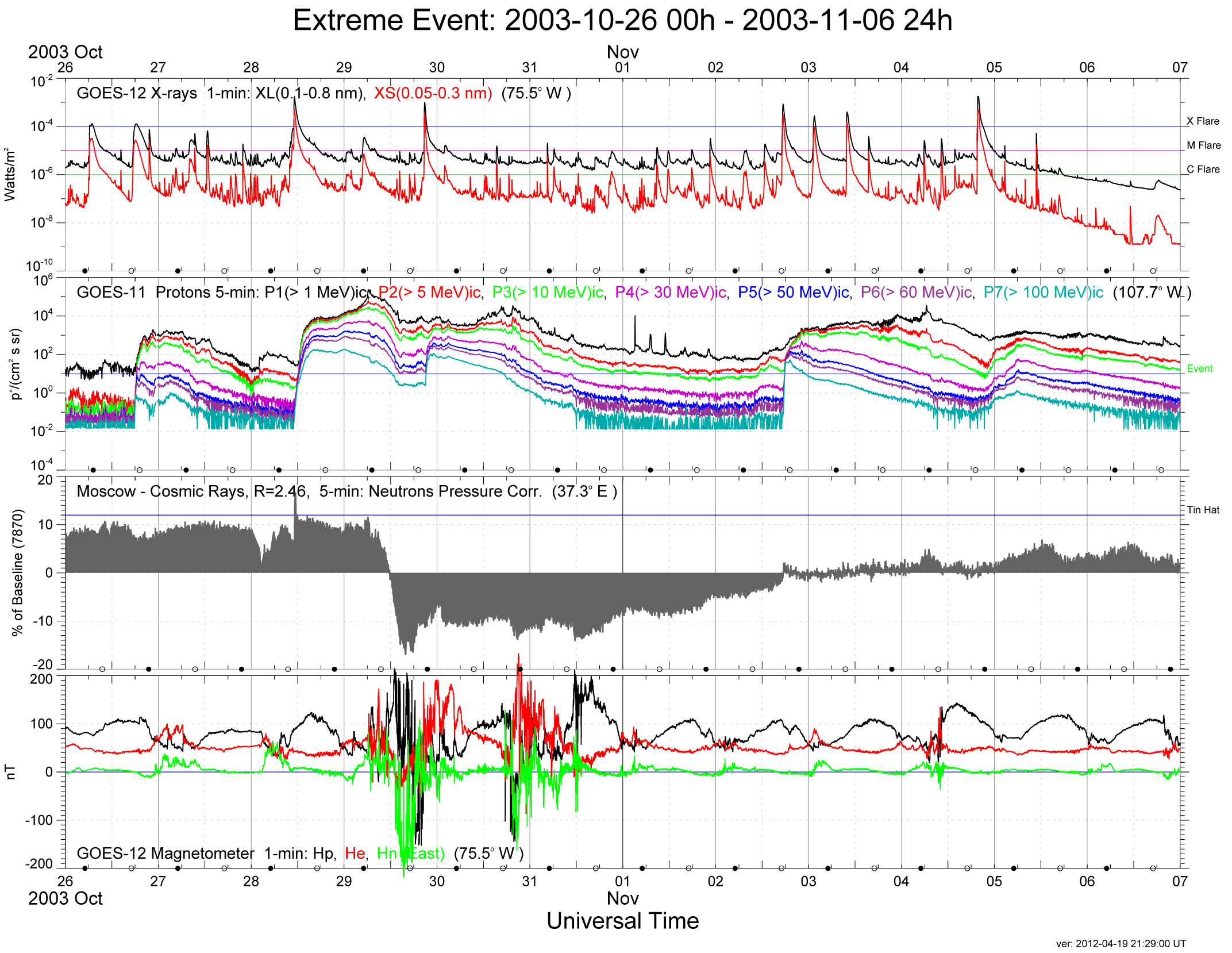
Various data recorded during the Halloween solar storms

One of the solar storms was compared by some scientists in its intensity to the Carrington Event of 1859.

These events occurred during solar cycle 23, approximately three years after its peak in 2000, which was marked by another occurrence of solar activity known as the Bastille Day event.

== See also ==
- List of solar storms
