= May 1921 geomagnetic storm =

Exceptionally powerful geomagnetic storm

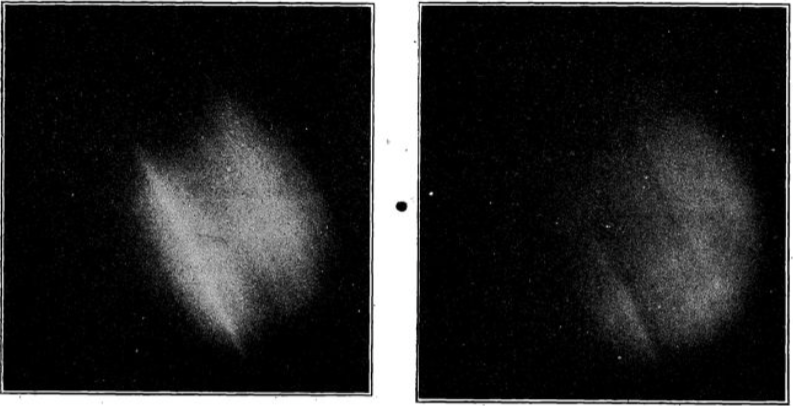
- Aurorae from the geomagnetic storm imaged by the Lowell Observatory

Geomagnetic storm
- Initial onset: 13 May 1921
- Dissipated: 15 May 1921
- Lowest Dst: −907±132 nT
- Impacts: Substantial damage to overhead and underwater telegraph equipment; electrical fires; localized electric grid interruptions

The three-day May 1921 geomagnetic storm, also known as the New York Railroad Storm, was caused by the impact of an extraordinarily powerful coronal mass ejection on Earth's magnetosphere. It occurred on 13–15 May as part of solar cycle 15, and was the most intense geomagnetic storm of the 20th century.

Since it occurred before the extensive interconnectivity of electrical systems and the general electrical dependence of infrastructure in the developed world, its effect was restricted; however, its ground currents were up to an order of magnitude greater than those of the March 1989 geomagnetic storm which interrupted electrical service to large parts of northeastern North America.

== Effects ==
The storm's electrical current sparked a number of fires worldwide, including one near Grand Central Terminal which made it known as the "New York Railroad Storm". Contemporary scientists estimated the size of the sunspot (AR1842) which began on May 10—and caused the storm—as 151,000 by 34,000 km (94,000 by 21,000 miles).

The storm was extensively reported in New York City, which was a center of telegraph activity as a railroad hub. Auroras ("northern lights") appeared throughout the eastern United States, creating brightly lit night skies. Telegraph service in the U.S. first slowed and then virtually stopped at about midnight on 14 May due to blown fuses and damaged equipment. Radio propagation was enhanced during the storm due to ionosphere involvement, however, enabling unusually good long-distance reception. Electric lights were not noticeably affected.

Undersea telegraph cables were affected by the storm. Damage to telegraph systems was also reported in Europe and the Southern Hemisphere.

=== Comparison to other geomagnetic storms ===
In space weather, the disturbance storm time index (Dst index) is a measure often used for determining the intensity of solar storms. A negative Dst index means that Earth's magnetic field is weakened—particularly the case during solar storms—with a more negative Dst index indicating a stronger solar storm.

A paper in 2019 estimated that the May 1921 geomagnetic storm had a peak Dst of −907±132 nT.

For comparison, the Carrington Event of 1859 had a peak Dst estimated to be between −800 nT and −1750 nT. The March 1989 geomagnetic storm had a peak Dst index of −589 nT.

== See also ==
- Active region
- Geomagnetic storm
- List of solar storms
