= Solar cycle 23 =

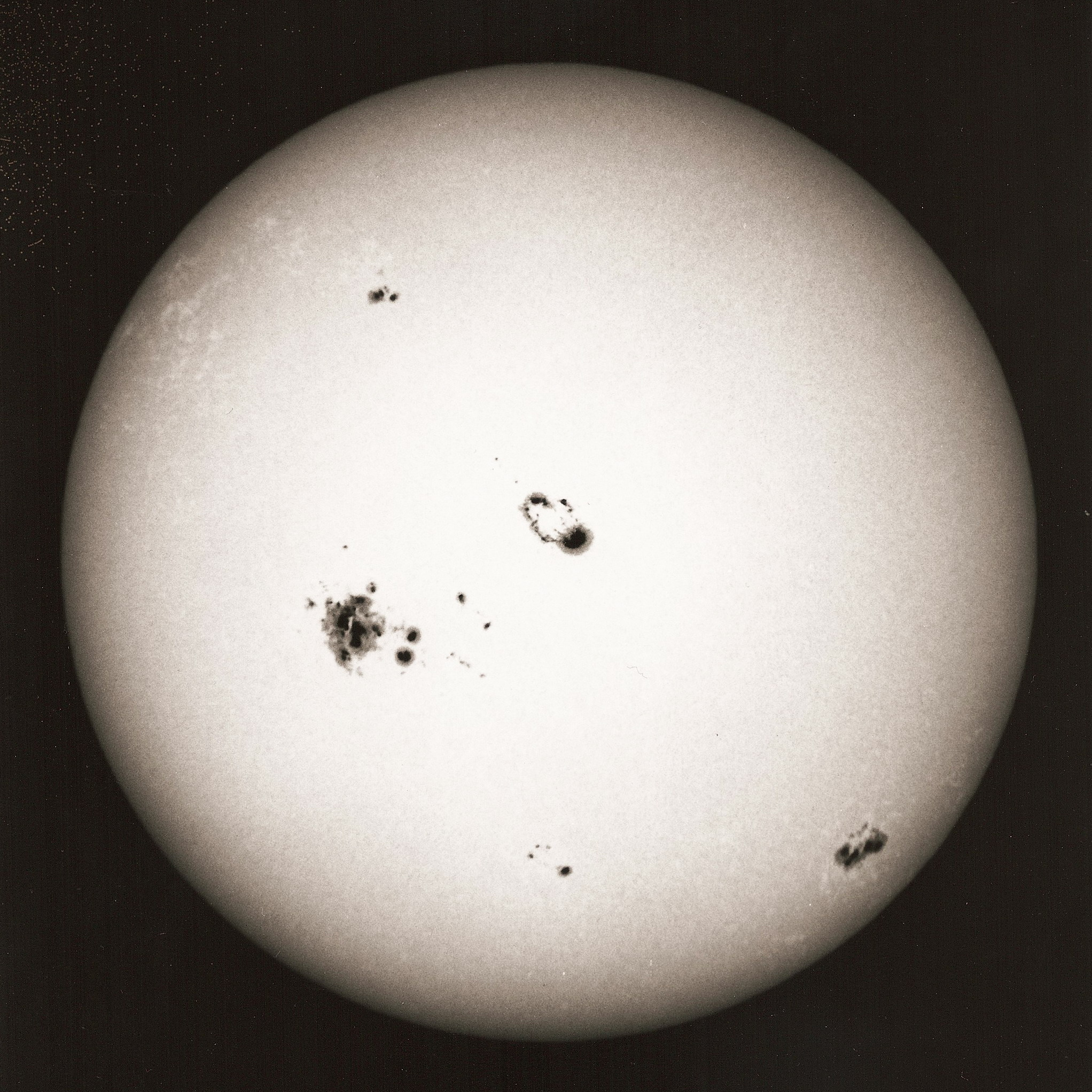
- The Sun, with some sunspots visible, during solar cycle 23 (2003)

Sunspot data
- Start date: August 1996
- End date: December 2008
- Duration (years): 12.3
- Max count: 180.3
- Max count month: November 2001
- Min count: 11.2
- Spotless days: 817

Cycle chronology
- Previous cycle: Solar cycle 22 (1986–1996)
- Next cycle: Solar cycle 24 (2008–late 2019)

NASA sunspot number predictions for Solar cycle 23 and 24

Solar cycle 23 was the 23rd solar cycle since 1755, when extensive recording of solar sunspot activity began. The solar cycle lasted 12.6 years, beginning in August 1996 and ending in December 2008. The maximum smoothed sunspot number observed during the solar cycle was 180.3 (November 2001), and the starting minimum was 11.2. During the minimum transit from solar cycle 23 to 24, there were a total of 817 days with no sunspots. Compared to the last several solar cycles, it was fairly average in terms of activity.

== History ==
Large solar flares and coronal mass ejections (CMEs) occurred on 7 September 2005 (X17), 15 April 2001 (X14.4) and 29 October 2003 (X10), with auroras visible in mid-latitudes.

=== 2000 ===
One of the first major aurora displays of solar cycle 23 occurred on 6 April 2000, with bright red auroras visible as far south as Florida and South Europe. On 14 July 2000, the CME hurled by a X5.7 solar flare provoked an extreme (G5 level) geomagnetic storm the next day. Known as the Bastille Day event, this storm caused damage to GPS systems and some power systems. Auroras were visible as far south as Texas.

=== 2001 ===
Another major aurora display was observed on 1 April 2001, due to a coronal mass ejection hitting the Earth's magnetosphere. Auroras were observed as far south as Mexico and South Europe. A large solar flare (the second-most powerful ever recorded) occurred on 2 April 2001, an X20-class, but the blast was directed away from Earth.

=== 2003 ===
In late October 2003, a series of large solar flares occurred. A X17.2-class flare ejected on 28 October 2003 produced auroras visible as far south as Florida and Texas. A G5 level geomagnetic storm blasted the Earth's magnetosphere over the next two days. A few days later, the largest solar flare ever measured with instruments occurred on 4 November; initially measured at X28, it was later upgraded to an X45-class. This flare was not Earth-oriented and thus only resulted in high-latitude auroras. The whole sequence of events that occurred from 28 October to 4 November is known as the Halloween Solar Storm.

== See also ==
- List of solar cycles
