= Russell–McPherron effect =

Explanation for geomagnetic variation

The Russell–McPherron effect explains the semiannual variation of geomagnetic activity through the relative position of Earth's magnetic field to the solar wind. The theory was published by the geophysicists Christopher Russell and Robert McPherron in 1973.

== Concept ==
Axial tilt during an orbit around the sun

As early as 1856 with a publication by Edward Sabine it is known that geomagnetic activity is higher near the spring and autumnal equinox than during other seasons. The higher occurrence is especially noticeable with large sun storms, like the Carrington Event. Around the equinoxes, Earth’s axis is perpendicular to the sun, whereas during the solistices it is tilted toward or away from the sun. Thanks to this geometry Earth’s magnetic field points north and can connect to the southward pointing field of the solar wind, through magnetic reconnection.

== Other factors ==
Other proposed factors that have a weaker influence than the Russell–McPherron effect include the equinoctial effect and the axial effect. The equinoctial effect stems also from Earth’s tilt being near zero at the equinoxes and therefore also its magnetic poles. They fall nearly at right angles to the solar wind which leads to more open interactions with it. The axial effect was proposed by Aloysius Cortie in 1912. It explains the semiannual geomagnetic activity with changes in Earth’s heliographic latitude and is based on the 7° tilt of the solar equatorial plane with respect to the ecliptic plane.
