= Communications blackout =

Halt to communication abilities or utilization

In telecommunications, communications blackouts are

- a cessation of communications or communications capability, caused by a lack of power to a communications facility or to communications equipment.
- a total lack of radio communications capability, caused by ionospheric anomalies, e.g., during strong auroral activity or during re-entry of a spacecraft into the Earth's atmosphere.

== Technical failures ==
Uptime being a key goal of most communications networks, power supplies and backup generators are typically used to ensure high-reliability power.

Wireless networks may be subject to radio jamming; wired networks can be physically severed. Network design can also play a role in maintaining communications reliability; depending on the constraints in building a fiber-optic network, a self-healing ring topology may be used.

== Spacecraft reentry ==
The communications blackouts that affect spacecraft re-entering the Earth's atmosphere, which are also known as radio blackouts, ionization blackouts, or reentry blackouts, are caused by an envelope of ionized air around the craft, created by the heat from the compression of the atmosphere by the craft. The ionized air interferes with radio signals. For the Mercury, Gemini, and Apollo spacecraft, such communications blackouts lasted for several minutes. Gemini 2, for example, endured such a blackout for four minutes, beginning at 9 minutes 5 seconds into the descent.

For Apollo missions, the communications blackout was approximately three minutes long. For Apollo 16, for example, pre-advisory data (PAD) for re-entry listed the expected times for re-entry communications blackout to be from 0 minutes 16 seconds after entry interface to 3 minutes 33 seconds after entry interface (a total of 3 minutes 17 seconds). For the Apollo 13 mission, the blackout was much longer than normal because the flight path of the spacecraft was unexpectedly at a much shallower angle than normal. According to the mission log maintained by Gene Kranz, the Apollo 13 re-entry blackout lasted around 6 minutes, beginning at 142:39 and ending at 142:45, and was 1 minute 27 seconds longer than had been predicted.

Communications blackouts for re-entry are not solely confined to entry into Earth's atmosphere. They apply to entry into any atmosphere where such ionization occurs around a craft. The Mars Pathfinder endured a 30-second communications blackout as it entered Mars' atmosphere, for example. The Huygens probe endured a communications blackout as it entered the atmosphere of Titan.

Until the creation of the Tracking and Data Relay Satellite System (TDRSS), the Space Shuttle endured a 30-minute blackout. The TDRSS allowed the Shuttle to communicate by relay with a Tracking and Data Relay Satellite during re-entry, through a "hole" in the ionized air envelope at the tail end of the craft, created by the Shuttle's shape.

== Space weather ==
Radio blackouts on Earth caused by solar flares are measured by the National Oceanic and Atmospheric Administration on a scale from R1 (minor) to R5 (extreme).

== Solar position ==
Communications can also be lost when the Sun is blocking or behind one station in the same line of sight; Sun outages periodically interrupt communications with geosynchronous satellites. It is also a common problem for interplanetary space missions.

== See also ==
- Sudden ionospheric disturbance
- Sun outage
