= Solar storm =

Disturbance on the Sun

A solar storm is a disturbance on the Sun, which can emanate outward across the heliosphere, affecting the entire Solar System, including Earth and its magnetosphere, and is the cause of space weather in the short-term with long-term patterns comprising space climate.

== Possible effects on Earth ==
A solar storm may produce a geomagnetic storm which could affect radio signals or power systems. Solar storms do not directly affect humans, however, failure or error of infrastructure may cause issues such as mass panic or large economic losses.

== Types ==
Solar storms include:

- Solar flare, a large explosion in the Sun's atmosphere caused by tangling, crossing or reorganizing of magnetic field lines
- Coronal mass ejection (CME), a massive burst of plasma from the Sun, sometimes associated with solar flares
- Geomagnetic storm, the interaction of the Sun's outburst with Earth's magnetic field
- Solar particle event (SPE), proton or energetic particle (SEP)

== See also ==
- List of solar storms
- Aurora, a luminous phenomenon induced by ionization and excitation of constituents of a planet's upper atmosphere
- Heliophysics, the scientific study of the Sun and region of space affected by the Sun
- Magnetic cloud, a transient disturbance in the solar wind
- Solar cycle, an 11-year cycle of sunspot activity
- Solar prominence, a plasma and magnetic structure in the Sun's corona
- Solar wind, the stream of particles and plasma emanating from the Sun
- Active region, where most solar flares and coronal mass ejections originate
