= K-index =

Geomagnetic storm indicator

The K-index quantifies disturbances in the horizontal component of Earth's magnetic field with an integer in the range 0–9 with 1 being calm and 5 or more indicating a geomagnetic storm. It is derived from the maximum fluctuations of horizontal components observed on a magnetometer during a three-hour interval. The label K comes from the German word kennziffer meaning characteristic digit. The K-index was introduced by Julius Bartels in 1939.

The similar HP30 and HP60 indices were developed in the 2020s, using a shorter interval in order to include shorter but more intense disturbances.

== Definition ==
The K-scale is a quasi-logarithmic scale derived from the maximum fluctuation R in the horizontal component of Earth's magnetic field observed on a magnetometer relative to a quiet day during a three-hour interval. The conversion table from maximum fluctuation to K-index varies from observatory to observatory in such a way that the historical rate of occurrence of certain levels of K are about the same at all observatories. In practice this means that observatories at higher geomagnetic latitude require higher levels of fluctuation for a given K-index. For example, the corresponding R value for K = 9 is 1500 nT in Qeqertarsuaq, Greenland; 300 nT in Honolulu, Hawaii; and 500 nT in Kiel, Germany.

The real-time K-index is determined after the end of prescribed intervals of 3 hours each: 00:00–03:00, 03:00–06:00, ..., 21:00–24:00. The maximum positive and negative deviations during the 3-hour period are added together to determine the total maximum fluctuation. These maximum deviations may occur any time during the 3-hour period.

== Derived indices ==
=== K_{p}-index ===
The K_{p}-index, or the planetary K-index, is derived by calculating a weighted average of K-indices from a network of 13 geomagnetic observatories at mid-latitude locations. Since these observatories do not report their data in real-time, various operations centers around the globe estimate the index based on data available from their local network of observatories. The K_{p}-index was introduced by Bartels in 1939.

=== a-index ===
The a-index is the three hourly equivalent amplitude for geomagnetic activity at a specific magnetometer station derived from the station-specific K-index. Because of the quasi-logarithmic relationship of the K-scale to magnetometer fluctuations, it is not meaningful to take the average of a set of K-indices directly. Instead each K is converted back into a linear scale.

Plot of a-index vs. K-index

Equivalent range a for given K
| K | 0 | 0+ | 1− | 1 | 1+ | 2− | 2 | 2+ | 3− | 3 | 3+ | 4− | 4 | 4+ |
| a | 0 | 2 | 3 | 4 | 5 | 6 | 7 | 9 | 12 | 15 | 18 | 22 | 27 | 32 |
| K | 5− | 5 | 5+ | 6− | 6 | 6+ | 7− | 7 | 7+ | 8− | 8 | 8+ | 9− | 9 |
| a | 39 | 48 | 56 | 67 | 80 | 94 | 111 | 132 | 154 | 179 | 207 | 236 | 300 | 400 |

The A-index is the daily average of amplitude for geomagnetic activity at a specific magnetometer station, derived from the eight (three hourly) a-indices.

The A_{p}-index is the averaged planetary A-index based on data from a set of specific K_{p} stations.

==== Example ====
If the K-indices for the day were 3, 4, 6, 5, 3, 2, 2 and 1, the daily A-index is the average of the equivalent amplitudes:

$$A = (15 + 27 + 80 + 48 + 15 + 7 + 7 + 4)/8 = 25.375$$

=== G-scale ===
The NOAA G-scale describes the significance of effects of a geomagnetic storm to the public and those affected by the space environment. It is directly derived from the K_{p}-scale, where G1 is the weakest storm classification (corresponding to a K_{p} value of 5) and G5 is the strongest (corresponding to a K_{p} value of 9).

Scale and effects of geomagnetic storms
| Scale | Level | Effect | | | K_{p} equivalent | Average frequency (1 cycle = 11 years) | Days during solar cycle 24 |
| Scale | Level | Power system | Spacecraft operations | Other systems | K_{p} equivalent | Average frequency (1 cycle = 11 years) | Days during solar cycle 24 |
|---|---|---|---|---|---|---|---|
| G1 | Minor | Weak power grid fluctuations can occur. | Minor impact on satellite operations possible. | Migratory animals are affected at this and higher levels; aurora is commonly visible at high latitudes (northern Michigan and Maine). | 5 | 1700 per cycle (900 days per cycle) | 256 |
| G2 | Moderate | High-latitude power systems may experience voltage alarms, long-duration storms may cause transformer damage. | Corrective actions to orientation may be required by ground control; possible changes in drag affect orbit predictions. | HF radio propagation can fade at higher latitudes, and aurora has been seen as low as New York and Idaho (typically 55° geomagnetic lat.). | 6 | 600 per cycle (360 days per cycle) | 86 |
| G3 | Strong | Voltage corrections may be required, false alarms triggered on some protection devices. | Surface charging may occur on satellite components, drag may increase on low-Earth-orbit satellites, and corrections may be needed for orientation problems. | Intermittent satellite navigation and low-frequency radio navigation problems may occur, HF radio may be intermittent, and aurora has been seen as low as Illinois and Oregon (typically 50° geomagnetic lat.). | 7 | 200 per cycle (130 days per cycle) | 18 |
| G4 | Severe | Possible widespread voltage control problems and some protective systems will mistakenly trip out key assets from the grid. | May experience surface charging and tracking problems, corrections may be needed for orientation problems. | Induced pipeline currents affect preventive measures, HF radio propagation sporadic, satellite navigation degraded for hours, low-frequency radio navigation disrupted, and aurora has been seen as low as Alabama and northern California (typically 45° geomagnetic lat.). | 8-9 | 100 per cycle (60 days per cycle) | 9 |
| G5 | Extreme | Widespread voltage control problems and protective system problems can occur, some grid systems may experience complete collapse or blackouts. Transformers may experience damage. | May experience extensive surface charging, problems with orientation, uplink/downlink and tracking satellites. | Pipeline currents can reach hundreds of amperes, HF (high frequency) radio propagation may be impossible in many areas for one to two days, satellite navigation may be degraded for days, low-frequency radio navigation can be out for hours, and aurora has been seen as low as Florida and southern Texas (typically 40° geomagnetic lat.). | 9 | 4 per cycle (4 days per cycle) | 1 |

== Use in radio propagation studies ==
The K_{p}-index is used for the study and prediction of ionospheric propagation of high frequency radio signals. Geomagnetic storms, indicated by a K_{p} = 5 or higher, have no direct effect on propagation. However they disturb the F-layer of the ionosphere, especially at middle and high geographical latitudes, causing a so-called ionospheric storm which degrades radio propagation. The degradation mainly consists of a reduction of the maximum usable frequency (MUF) by as much as 50%. Sometimes the E-layer may be affected as well. In contrast with sudden ionospheric disturbances (SID), which affect high frequency radio paths mostly at mid and low latitudes, the effects of ionospheric storms are more intense at high latitudes and the polar regions.

== See also ==
- Disturbance storm time index
