= Disturbance storm time index =

Measure of the Earth's ring current

The disturbance storm time index, also known as the Dst index or Kyoto Dst index, is a measure of the strength of the Earth's ring current.

The ring current around Earth produces a magnetic field that is directly opposite Earth's magnetic field; that is, if the difference between solar electrons and protons gets higher, then Earth's magnetic field becomes weaker.

A negative Dst value means that Earth's magnetic field is weakened. This is particularly the case during solar storms.

Its units are typically measured in nT (nanoteslas).

== See also ==
- K-index
