= Hawkwood =

Hawkwood may refer to:

== Places ==
- Hawkwood, Calgary, a neighbourhood in Calgary, Alberta, Canada
- Hawkwood, London, a 25-acre estate in North Chingford, London, England
- Hawkwood, Queensland, a locality in the North Burnett Region, Queensland, Australia
- Hawkwood (Gordonsville, Virginia), United States, a historic house
- Hawkwood College, an education centre in Gloucestershire, UK

== People ==
- Clifford Hawkwood (1909–1960), English cricketer.
- John Hawkwood (c. 1323–1394), English soldier, mercenary and "condottiero" in Italy, known also as "Giovanni Acuto".
- H. Bedford-Jones, Canadian writer who used the pen-name Allan Hawkwood.

== Fiction ==
- Hawkwood, a fictional character in the 1985 film Flesh and Blood
- Matthew Hawkwood, the main character in the historical adventure novels by English novelist James McGee

== See also ==
- Hawk Woods
- Hawkswood
