= Gristhorpe =

Village and civil parish in North Yorkshire, England

Coordinates: 54.221900°N 0.333700°W

- Location within North Yorkshire
- Population: 397 (2011 census)
- OS grid reference: TA087819
- Civil parish: Gristhorpe
- Unitary authority: North Yorkshire
- Ceremonial county: North Yorkshire
- Region: Yorkshire and the Humber
- Country: England
- Sovereign state: United Kingdom
- Post town: FILEY
- Postcode district: YO14
- Police: North Yorkshire
- Fire: North Yorkshire
- Ambulance: Yorkshire
- UK Parliament: Scarborough and Whitby

Gristhorpe is a village and civil parish in the county of North Yorkshire, England. According to the 2011 UK census, Gristhorpe parish had a population of 397, an increase on the 2001 UK census figure of 386.

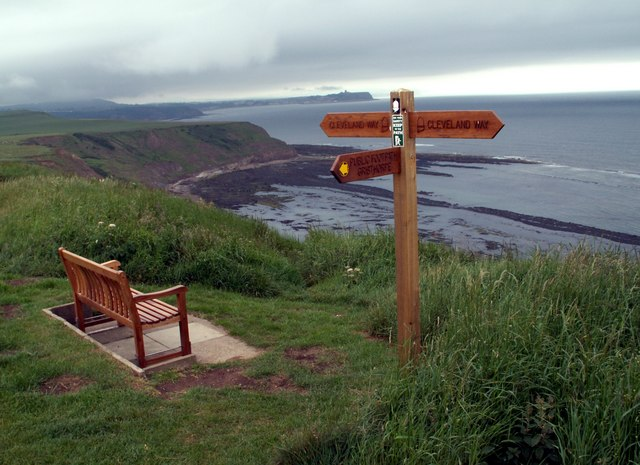
The Cleveland Way long-distance footpath passes near Gristhorpe; a view from the clifftops by the path

The remains of Gristhorpe Man, now on display in the Rotunda Museum, Scarborough, were found buried in a tree trunk in Gristhorpe in the 19th century.

From 1974 to 2023 it was part of the Borough of Scarborough, it is now administered by the unitary North Yorkshire Council.

Gristhorpe railway station on the Yorkshire Coast Line from Hull to Scarborough served the village until it closed on 16 February 1959.

The village main street features a small privately owned church, constructed of corrugated steel sheeting and a village public house, named "The Bull Inn".

The entrance to the village was previously dominated by Dale Power Solutions generator manufacturing plant. Established in 1935 by Leonard Dale, it provided standby power services and products for a wide range of applications. The plant was demolished in late 2019 and in early 2020 a new housing development was begun. (This is still in the early construction stage, May 2020)

== See also ==
- Listed buildings in Gristhorpe
