= William Crawford Williamson =

English naturalist and palaeobotanist (1816–1895)

William Crawford Williamson FRS
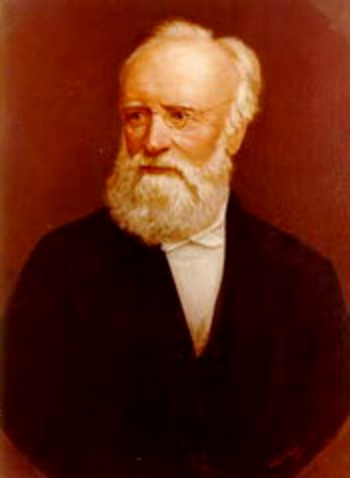
- William Crawford Williamson (1863)
- Born: 24 November 1816; Scarborough, North Yorkshire, Yorkshire
- Died: 23 June 1895 (aged 78)
- Education: University College London
- Occupations: Naturalist; Palaeobotanist

William Crawford Williamson (24 November 1816 – 23 June 1895) was an English naturalist and palaeobotanist.

== Early life ==
Williamson was born at Scarborough, North Yorkshire, the son of John Williamson, and Elizabeth Crawford. His father, after beginning life as a gardener, became a well-known local naturalist, who, in conjunction with William Bean, first explored the rich fossiliferous beds of the Yorkshire coast. He was for many years first curator of the Scarborough natural history museum (Rotunda Museum). William Smith, the "father of English geology," lived for two years in the Williamsons' house. Young Williamson's maternal grandfather was a lapidary, and from him he learnt the art of cutting stones.

== Career ==
Entering a medical career, he for three years acted as curator of the Natural History Society's museum at Manchester. After completing his medical studies at University College London, in 1841, he returned to Manchester to practise his profession.

He was elected to membership of the Manchester Literary and Philosophical Society on 29 April 1851. and to President of the Society 1884–86

When Owen's College at Manchester was founded in 1851 he became professor of natural history there, with the duty of teaching geology, zoology and botany. A division of labour took place as additional professors were appointed, but he retained the chair of botany down to 1892. Williamson's teaching work was not confined to his university classes, for he was also a successful popular lecturer, especially for the Gilchrist Trust. Shortly afterwards retiring in 1892 he moved to Clapham, where he died.

He was elected a Fellow of the Royal Society in 1854, winning its Royal Medal in 1874 and delivering the Bakerian Lecture in 1877.

== Works ==
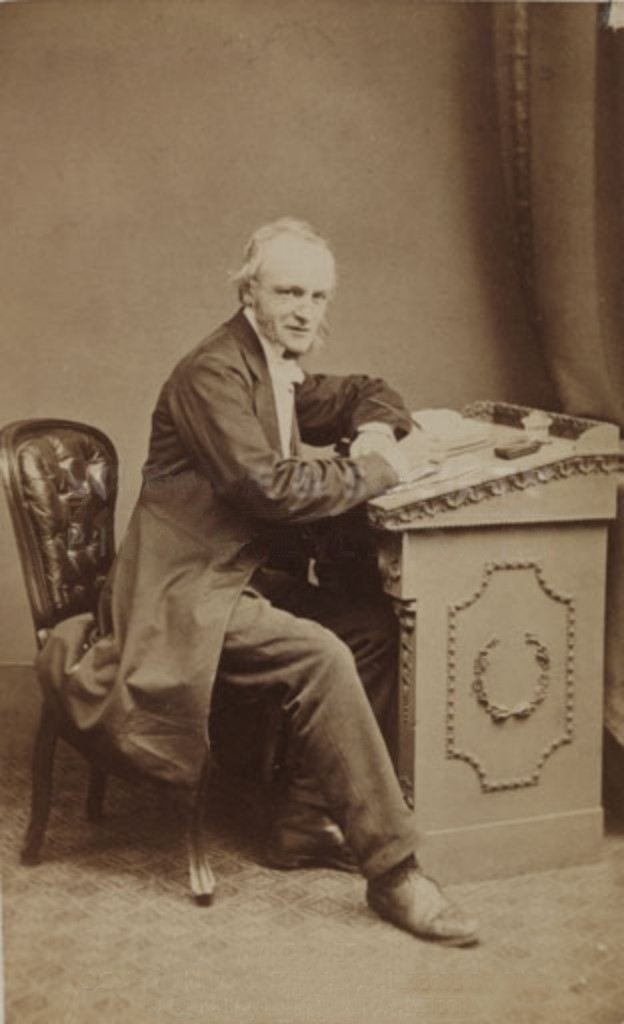
William Williamson

Williamson when little more than sixteen he published a paper on the rare birds of Yorkshire, in 1834 a monograph on the Gristhorpe Man, and still in 1834, presented to the Geological Society of London his first memoir on the Mesozoic fossils of his native district. He assisted Lindley and Hutton in the preparation of their Fossil Flora of Great Britain.

His scientific work was pursued in the midst of official and professional duties. In geology, his early work on the zones of distribution of Mesozoic fossils (begun in 1834), and on the part played by microscopic organisms in the formation of marine deposits (1845), was pioneering. In zoology, his investigations of the development of the teeth and bones of fishes (1842–1851), and on recent Foraminifera, a group on which he wrote a monograph for the Ray Society in 1857, were valuable. In botany, in addition to a memoir on the minute structure of Volvox (1852), his work on the structure of fossil plants established British palaeobotany on a scientific basis; Williamson ranks with Adolphe Theodore Brongniart as one of its founders.

== Legacy ==
The species Bathyporeia guilliamsoniana was named in his honour by Charles Spence Bate.

== Notes ==
Professional and academic associations
| Preceded by Sir Henry Enfield Roscoe | President of the Manchester Literary and Philosophical Society; 1884–86 | Succeeded by Robert Dukinfield Darbishire |
