= Solar rotation =

Differential rotation of the Sun

The solar rotation can be seen in the background of this false color video.

Solar rotation is the rotation of the Sun about its own axis. The Sun is not a solid body, but is composed of a gaseous plasma, and different latitudes rotate with different periods. The solar rotation period is 25.67 days at the equator and increases with increasing latitude, reaching 33.40 days at 75 degrees of latitude. The source of this differential rotation is an area of current research in solar astronomy.

== Axis of rotation ==
The Sun's axis of rotation is inclined slightly from the axis of Earth's orbit in the ecliptic plane, resulting in observers on Earth seeing more of the Sun's north pole in September and more of the Sun's south pole in March. The direction of the Sun's axis of rotation was first inferred from the proper motion of sunspots. The standard values used to define the axis of rotation were derived in this manner by Richard C. Carrington in 1863. He found that the inclination angle between the Sun's equator and the plane of the ecliptic was 7.25 degrees and the longitude between the cross point of the solar equator with the ecliptic and the March equinox was 73.67 degrees for the year 1850.

== Surface rotation as an equation ==
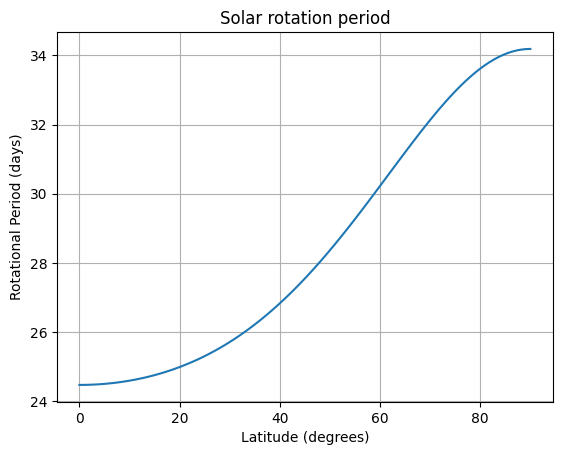
Solar rotation period as a function of latitude. Plotted according to $\omega=A+B\,\sin^2(\varphi)+C\,\sin^4(\varphi)$.

The differential rotation rate of the photosphere can be approximated by the equation:

$$\omega=A+B\,\sin^2(\varphi)+C\,\sin^4(\varphi)$$

where $\omega$ is the angular velocity in degrees per day, $\varphi$ is the solar latitude, A is angular velocity at the equator, and B, C are constants controlling the decrease in velocity with increasing latitude. The values of A, B, and C differ depending on the techniques used to make the measurement, as well as the time period studied. A current set of accepted average values is:

$$A= 14.713 \pm 0.0491\ ^{\circ}/\text{day}$$
$$B= -2.396 \pm 0.188\ ^{\circ}/\text{day}$$
$$C= -1.787 \pm 0.253\ ^{\circ}/\text{day}$$

== Sidereal rotation ==
At the equator, the solar rotation period is 24.47 days. This is called the sidereal rotation period, and should not be confused with the synodic rotation period of 26.24 days, which is the time for a fixed feature on the Sun to rotate to the same apparent position as viewed from Earth (the Earth's orbital rotation is in the same direction as the Sun's rotation). The synodic period is longer because the Sun must rotate for a sidereal period plus an extra amount due to the orbital motion of Earth around the Sun. Note that astrophysical literature does not typically use the equatorial rotation period, but instead often uses the definition of a Carrington rotation: a synodic rotation period of 27.2753 days or a sidereal period of 25.38 days. This chosen period roughly corresponds to the prograde rotation at a latitude of 26° north or south, which is consistent with the typical latitude of sunspots and corresponding periodic solar activity. When the Sun is viewed from the "north" (above Earth's north pole), solar rotation is counterclockwise (eastward). To a person standing on Earth's North Pole at the time of equinox, sunspots would appear to move from left to right across the Sun's face.

In Stonyhurst heliographic coordinates, the left side of the Sun's face is called East, and the right side of the Sun's face is called West. Therefore, sunspots are said to move across the Sun's face from east to west.

=== Bartels' rotation number ===
Bartels' rotation number is a serial count that numbers the apparent rotations of the Sun as viewed from Earth, and is used to track certain recurring or shifting patterns of solar activity. For this purpose, each rotation has a length of exactly 27 days, close to the synodic Carrington rotation rate. Julius Bartels arbitrarily assigned rotation day one to 8 February 1832. The serial number serves as a kind of calendar to mark the recurrence periods of solar and geophysical parameters.

=== Carrington rotation ===
Five year video of Sun, one frame per Carrington period.

The Carrington rotation is a system for comparing locations on the Sun over a period of time, allowing the following of sunspot groups or reappearance of eruptions at a later time.

Because solar rotation is variable with latitude, depth and time, any such system is necessarily arbitrary and only makes comparison meaningful over moderate periods of time. Solar rotation is taken to be 27.2753 days (see below) for the purpose of Carrington rotations. Each rotation of the Sun under this scheme is given a unique number called the Carrington Rotation Number, starting from November 9, 1853.

The heliographic longitude of a solar feature conventionally refers to its angular distance relative to the central meridian crossed by the Sun-Earth radial line. The "Carrington longitude" of the same feature refers to an arbitrary fixed reference point of an imagined rigid rotation, as defined originally by Richard Christopher Carrington.

Carrington determined the solar rotation rate from low latitude sunspots in the 1850s and arrived at 25.38 days for the sidereal rotation period. Sidereal rotation is measured relative to the stars, but because the Earth is orbiting the Sun, we see this period as 27.2753 days.

It is possible to construct a diagram with the longitude of sunspots horizontally and time vertically. The longitude is measured by the time of crossing the central meridian and based on the Carrington rotations. In each rotation, plotted under the preceding ones, most sunspots or other phenomena will reappear directly below the same phenomenon on the previous rotation. There may be slight drifts left or right over longer periods of time.

The Bartels "musical diagram" or the Condegram spiral plot are other techniques for expressing the approximate 27-day periodicity of various phenomena originating at the solar surface.

== Using sunspots to measure rotation ==
The rotation constants have been measured by measuring the motion of various features ("tracers") on the solar surface. The first and most widely used tracers are sunspots. Though sunspots had been observed since ancient times, it was only when the telescope came into use that they were observed to turn with the Sun, and thus the period of the solar rotation could be defined. The English scholar Thomas Harriot was probably the first to observe sunspots telescopically as evidenced by a drawing in his notebook dated December 8, 1610. Johannes Fabricius, who systematically observed the spots for a few months and noted also their movement across the solar disc, published the first observations in June 1611, in De Maculis in Sole Observatis, et Apparente earum cum Sole Conversione Narratio ("Narration on Spots Observed on the Sun and their Apparent Rotation with the Sun". This can be considered the first observational evidence of the solar rotation. Christoph Scheiner (Rosa Ursine sive solis, book 4, part 2, 1630) was the first to measure the equatorial rotation rate of the Sun and noticed that the rotation at higher latitudes is slower, so he can be considered the discoverer of solar differential rotation.

Each measurement gives a slightly different answer, yielding the above standard deviations (shown as +/−). St. John (1918) was perhaps the first to summarise the published solar rotation rates, and concluded that the differences in series measured in different years can hardly be attributed to personal observation or to local disturbances on the Sun, and are probably due to time variations in the rate of rotation, and Hubrecht (1915) was the first one to find that the two solar hemispheres rotate differently. A study of magnetograph data showed a synodic period in agreement with other studies of 26.24 days at the equator and almost 38 days at the poles.

Internal rotation in the Sun, showing differential rotation in the outer convective region and almost uniform rotation in the central radiative region. The transition between these regions is called the tachocline.

== Internal solar rotation ==
Until the advent of helioseismology, the study of wave oscillations in the Sun, very little was known about the internal rotation of the Sun. The differential profile of the surface was thought to extend into the solar interior as rotating cylinders of constant angular momentum. Through helioseismology this is now known not to be the case and the rotation profile of the Sun has been found. On the surface, the Sun rotates slowly at the poles and quickly at the equator. This profile extends on roughly radial lines through the solar convection zone to the interior. At the tachocline the rotation abruptly changes to solid-body rotation in the solar radiation zone.

== See also ==
- Differential rotation in stars
- Solar coordinate systems
- Magnetohydrodynamics
- Orbital period
- Tachocline
