= Treetrunk coffin =

Coffin made from a single log

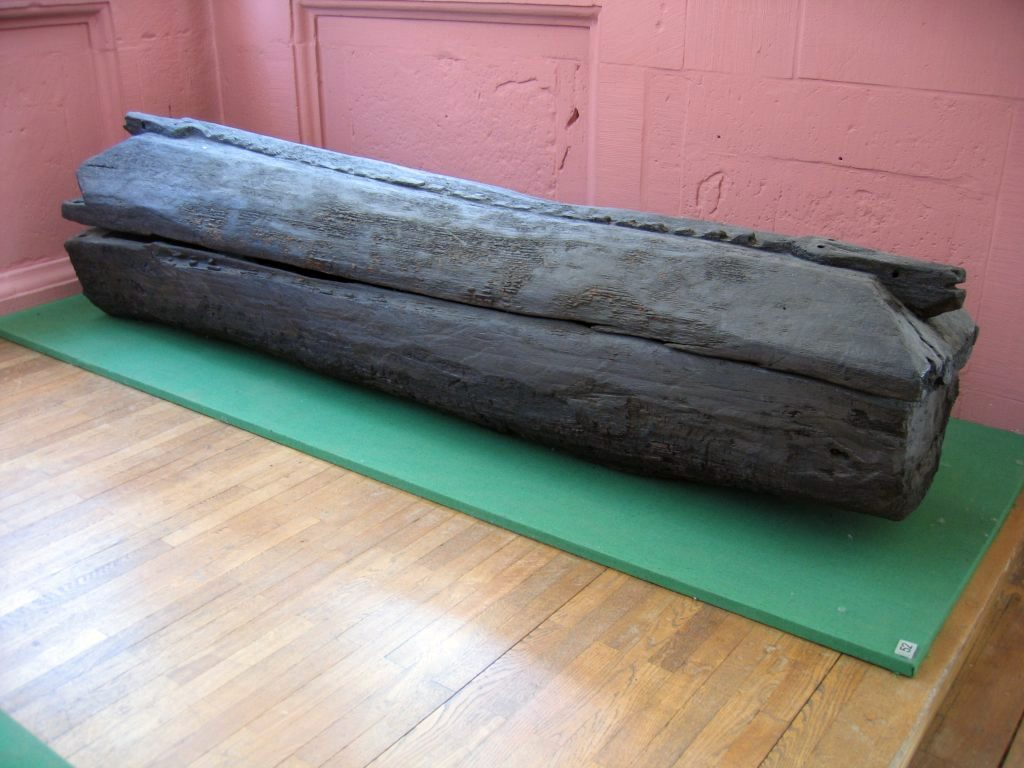
Treetrunk coffin from the early mediaeval graveyard of Oberflacht, Germany

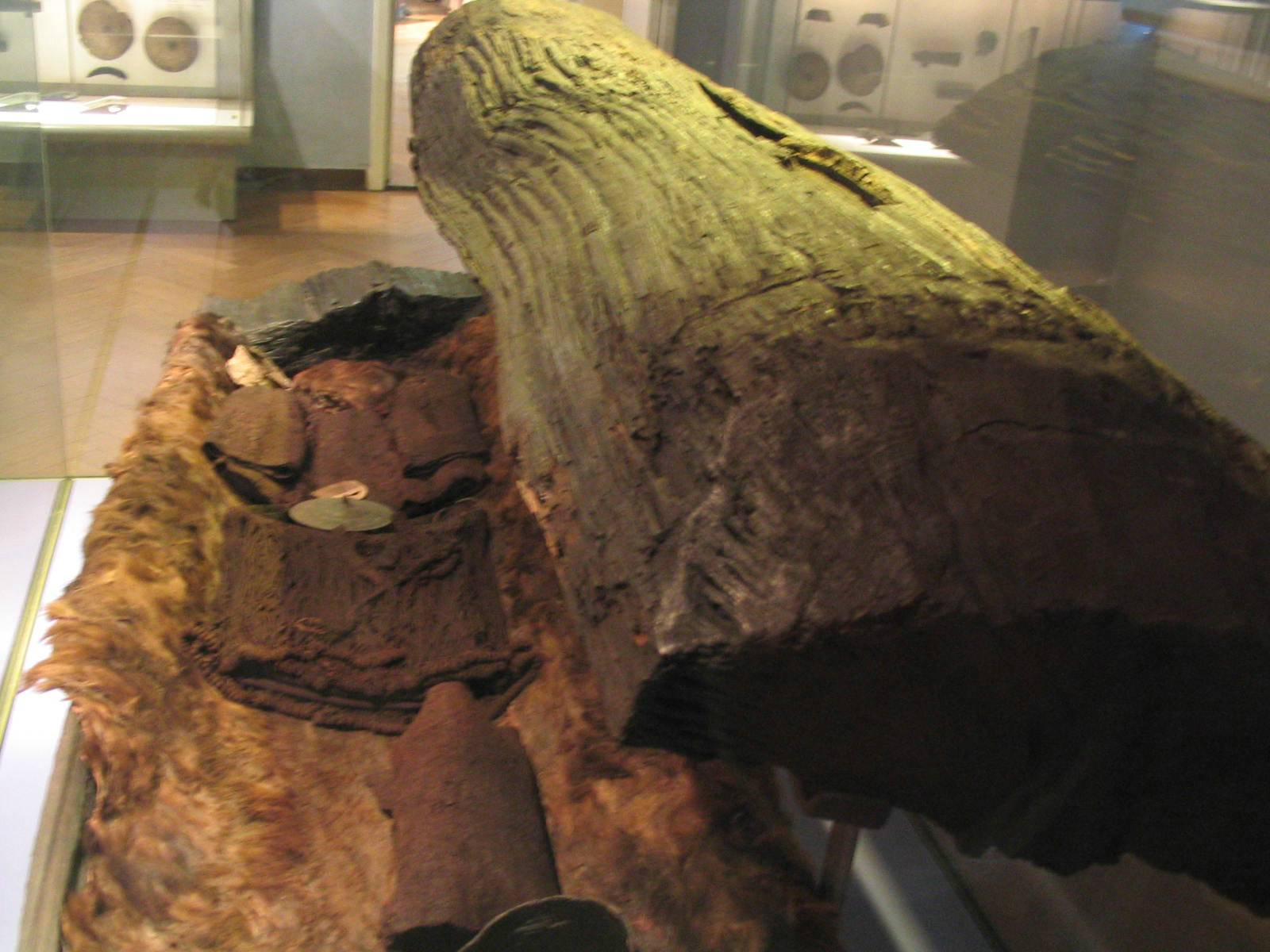
Treetrunk coffin from the Egtved Girl

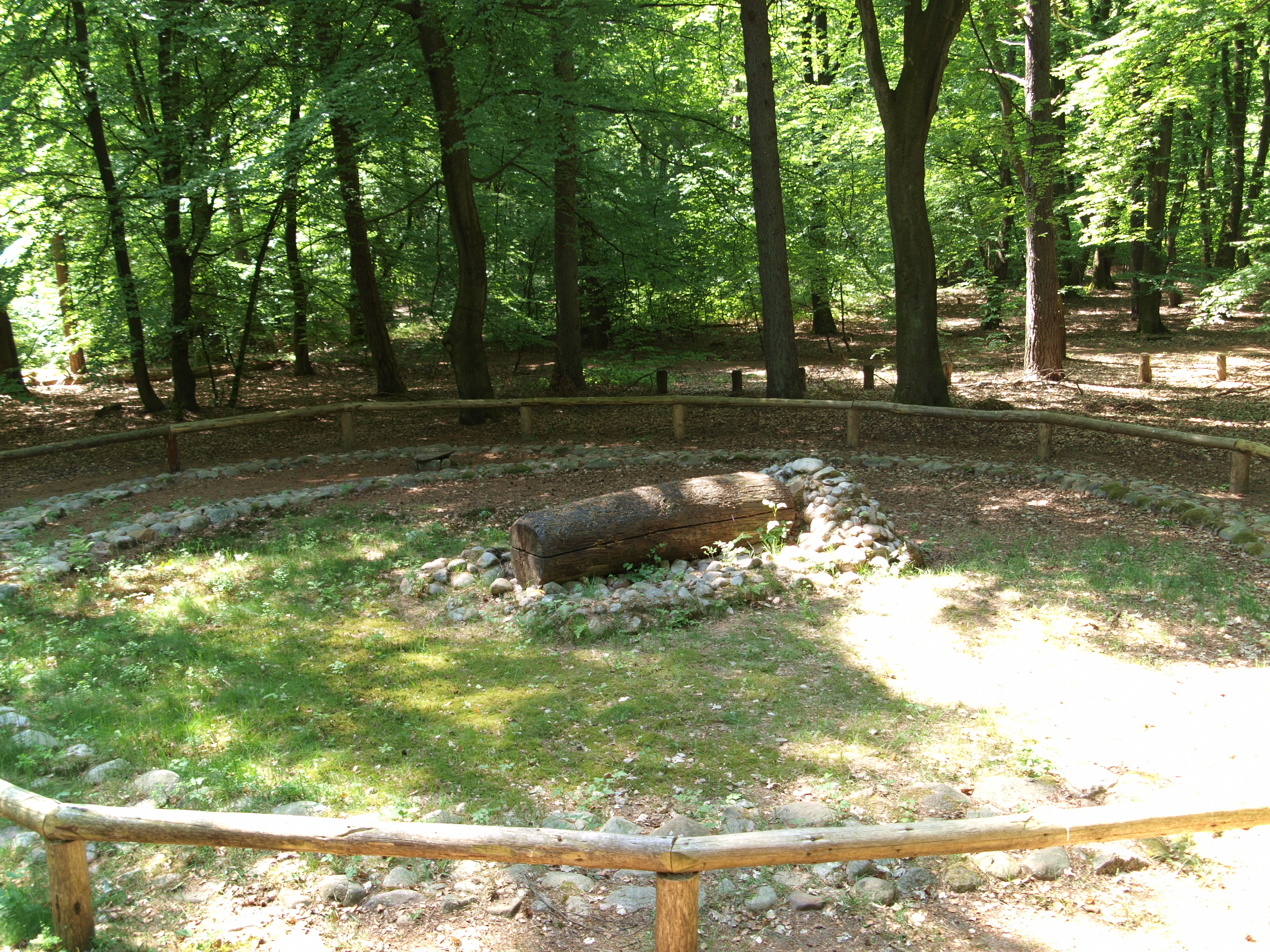
Reconstruction of the place of two treetrunk coffins at the Archäologischer Wanderpfad in der Fischbeker Heide, Neugraben-Fischbek

A treetrunk coffin is a coffin hollowed out of a single massive log. Such coffins have been used for burials since prehistoric times over a wide geographic range, including in Europe, Africa, Asia and Australia.

== History ==
Treetrunk coffins were a feature of some prehistoric elite burials over a wide geographical range, especially in Northern Europe and as far east as the Balts, where cremation was abandoned about the 1st century CE, as well as in central Lithuania, where elites were also buried in treetrunk coffins. The practice survived Christianisation into the Middle Ages.

== Examples by country ==
=== UK ===
The coffin that contained the body of King Arthur is said to have been discovered at Glastonbury Abbey in 1191. It was described by the contemporary chronicler Giraldus Cambrensis as being made of a massive oak treetrunk.

For Bronze Age Britain, examples have been recorded at Wydon Eals, near Haltwhistle, and at Cartington (formerly County Durham, now Northumberland) as well as in Scotland, Yorkshire, East Anglia, and Hampshire. In 2018 a 4,000-year-old treetrunk coffin, along with human remains and an axe, were discovered beneath a golf course at Tetney near Grimsby in Lincolnshire. The find has been conserved at a specialist facility of York Archaeology in York, with the help of a £70,000 grant from Historic England.

An example from Yorkshire is the "Gristhorpe Man", a well-preserved human of the second millennium BCE, who was found on 10 July 1834 under an ancient burial mound, buried in a hollow oak tree trunk and conserved at the Rotunda Museum, Scarborough. He was wrapped in an animal skin with a whalebone, bronze dagger, and food for his journey.

=== Belgium ===
At the abbey of Munsterbilzen, Belgium, ten graves with massive treetrunk coffins were discovered in 2006.

=== Denmark ===
The Egtved Girl was buried in a treetrunk coffin near Egtved, Denmark in around 1370 BCE.

=== Egypt ===
The phenomenon was not restricted to regions where massive timber was abundant. In Egypt, the conservation of a 1st-century cypresswood coffin hollowed from a single log, from a burial at Touna El Gebel, has been described.

=== Canary Islands ===
In 1957, a log-coffin was found in El Maipés Necropolis, Agaete, northwest Gran Canaria. The coffin was made of a pine trunk, buried inside a tumulus and contained the human remains of an adult, dated 1016-1169 CE.

=== Australia ===
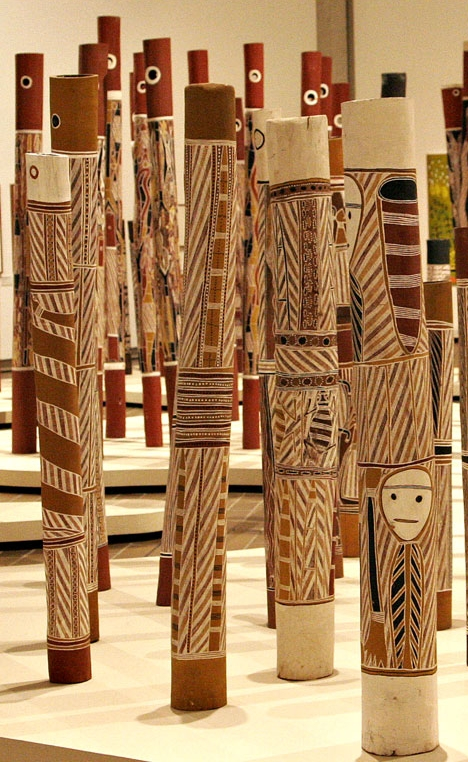
Memorial poles at the National Gallery of Australia

The hollow log coffin (also known as memorial poles, lorrkkon, ḻarrakitj, or ḏupun) has been used in burials of Yolngu and Bininj peoples of Arnhem Land in the Northern Territory of Australia for millennia. They vary in size: those made for a burial ceremony are large, while smaller logs may hold the bones of a person, to be kept by their family for some time. They can also represent the deceased person, with designs mirroring those painted on the body during the burial rites. Sometimes there is a small painted or carved hole near the top, provided to allow the deceased's soul to look out on the land. Traditionally, the log is that of the stringybark Eucalyptus tetrodonta which has been naturally hollowed out by termites. The poles are painted with elaborate and intricate designs, which relate to the deceased's clan, and are believed to help guide the soul to its home, where spirits and ancestors would then recognise it.

In recent decades, the larrakitj have been created as artworks, and have been exhibited in many major Australian galleries. The National Gallery of Australia in Canberra holds an installation called the Aboriginal Memorial, originally created in 1988.

=== China ===
Because hollowed trunks suggest dugout boats, such burials are sometimes described as boat burials. In Yanjinggou Developing Zone of Chengdu such a "boat burial" in a hollowed-out treetrunk found in 2006 was dated to the Warring States Era (475–221 BCE); it contained copper objects, bronze weapons, pottery and lacquer wares, seeds and peach pits. Its burial was the most recent of eight burials in coffins hollowed out of single treetrunks one and a half metres in diameter, five meters in length, with tapered ends bow and stern.
