= Central meridian =

Central meridian may mean:

- Central meridian (astronomy), the meridian that goes through the centre of the body's disc as seen from the point of view of the observer
- Central meridian (cartography), a line used to define the origin of some map projections

== See also ==
- Prime meridian, any of many central meridians used to define the origin of terrestrial or planetary longitudes
- Principal meridian, a meridian used for survey control in a large region.
