= Rotation period =

Time that it takes to complete one rotation relative to the background stars

Earth's rotation imaged by Deep Space Climate Observatory, with axis tilt

In astronomy, the rotation period or spin period of a celestial object (e.g., star, planet, moon, asteroid) has two definitions. The first one corresponds to the sidereal rotation period (or sidereal day), i.e., the time that the object takes to complete a full rotation around its axis relative to the background stars (inertial space). The other type of commonly used "rotation period" is the object's synodic rotation period (or solar day), which may differ, by a fraction of a rotation or more than one rotation, to accommodate the portion of the object's orbital period around a star or another body during one day.

== Measuring rotation ==
For solid objects, such as rocky planets and asteroids, the rotation period is a single value. For gaseous or fluid bodies, such as stars and giant planets, the period of rotation varies from the object's equator to its pole due to a phenomenon called differential rotation. Typically, the stated rotation period for a giant planet (such as Jupiter, Saturn, Uranus, Neptune) is its internal rotation period, as determined from the rotation of the planet's magnetic field. For objects that are not spherically symmetrical, the rotation period is, in general, not fixed, even in the absence of gravitational or tidal forces. This is because, although the rotation axis is fixed in space (by the conservation of angular momentum), it is not necessarily fixed in the body of the object itself. As a result of this, the moment of inertia of the object around the rotation axis can vary, and hence the rate of rotation can vary (because the product of the moment of inertia and the rate of rotation is equal to the angular momentum, which is fixed). For example, Hyperion, a moon of Saturn, exhibits this behaviour, and its rotation period is described as chaotic.

== Rotation period of selected objects ==
Animation of the planets and dwarf planets (Pluto and Ceres) relative rotation period (using sidereal time)

Celestial objects	Rotation period with respect to distant stars, the sidereal rotation period (compared to Earth's mean Solar days)		Synodic rotation period (mean Solar day)	Apparent rotational period viewed from Earth
Sun (Note: See Solar rotation for more detail.)	25.379995 days (Carrington rotation); 35 days (high latitude)	25^{d} 9^{h} 7^{m} 11.6^{s} 35^{d}		~28 days (equatorial)
Mercury	58.6462 days	58^{d} 15^{h} 30^{m} 30^{s}	176 days	
Venus	−243.0226 days (Note: This rotation is negative because the pole which points north of the invariable plane rotates in the opposite direction to most other planets.)	−243^{d} 0^{h} 33^{m}	−116.75 days	
Earth	0.99726968 days (Note: Reference adds about 1 ms to Earth's stellar day given in mean solar time to account for the length of Earth's mean solar day in excess of 86400 SI seconds.)	0^{d} 23^{h} 56^{m} 4.0910^{s}	1.00 days (24^{h} 00^{m} 00^{s})	
Moon	27.321661 days (equal to sidereal orbital period due to spin-orbit locking, a sidereal lunar month)	27^{d} 7^{h} 43^{m} 11.5^{s}	29.530588 days (equal to synodic orbital period, due to spin-orbit locking, a synodic lunar month)	none (due to spin-orbit locking)
Mars	1.02595675 days	1^{d} 0^{h} 37^{m} 22.663^{s}	1.02749125 days	
Ceres	0.37809 days	0^{d} 9^{h} 4^{m} 27.0^{s}	0.37818 days	
Jupiter	0.41354 days(average); 0.4135344 days (deep interior (Note: Rotation period of the deep interior is that of the planet's magnetic field.)); 0.41007 days (equatorial); 0.4136994 days (high latitude)	0^{d} 9^{h} 55^{m} 30^{s} 0^{d} 9^{h} 55^{m} 29.37^{s} 0^{d} 9^{h} 50^{m} 30^{s} 0^{d} 9^{h} 55^{m} 43.63^{s}	0.41358 d (9 h 55 m 33 s) (average)	
Saturn	0.44002+0.00130 −0.00091 days (average, deep interior (Note: Found through examination of Saturn's C Ring)); 0.44401 days (deep interior); 0.4264 days (equatorial); 0.44335 days (high latitude)	10^{h} 33^{m} 38^{s} ^{+ 1^{m} 52^{s}}_{− 1^{m} 19^{s}} 0^{d} 10^{h} 39^{m} 22.4^{s} 0^{d} 10^{h} 13^{m} 59^{s} 0^{d} 10^{h} 38^{m} 25.4^{s}	0.43930 d (10 h 32 m 36 s)	
Uranus	−0.71833 days	−0^{d} 17^{h} 14^{m} 24^{s}	−0.71832 d (−17 h 14 m 23 s)	
Neptune	0.67125 days	0^{d} 16^{h} 6^{m} 36^{s}	0.67125 d (16 h 6 m 36 s)	
Pluto	−6.38718 days (synchronous with Charon)	–6^{d} 9^{h} 17^{m} 32^{s}	−6.38680 d (–6^{d} 9^{h} 17^{m} 0^{s})	
Haumea	0.1631458 ±0.0000042 days	0^{d} 3^{h} 56^{m} 43.80 ±0.36^{s}	0.1631461 ±0.0000042 days	
Makemake	0.9511083 ±0.0000042 days	22^{h} 49^{m} 35.76 ±0.36^{s}	0.9511164 ±0.0000042 days	
Eris	~15.786 days	~15^{d} 18^{h} 53^{m}	~15.7872 days	

Orbital periods and velocities of the planets
Planet	Orbital period (days)	Orbital period (Earth years)	Orbital velocity (*)
Mercury	87.969	0.241	47.9 km/s (29.8 mi/s)
Venus	224.701	0.615	35.0 km/s (21.7 mi/s)
Earth	365.256	1.000	29.8 km/s (18.5 mi/s)
Mars	686.980	1.881	24.1 km/s (15.0 mi/s)
Jupiter	4,332.589	11.862	13.1 km/s (8.1 mi/s)
Saturn	10,759.22	29.457	9.7 km/s (6.0 mi/s)
Uranus	30,688.5	84.020	6.8 km/s (4.2 mi/s)
Neptune	60,182	164.8	5.4 km/s (3.4 mi/s)

- Orbital velocity values are mean orbital speeds along each planet's orbit around the Sun.

== See also ==
- Apparent retrograde motion
- Day length fluctuations
- Earth's rotation periods
- List of slow rotators (minor planets)
- List of fast rotators (minor planets)
- Retrograde motion
- Rotation (astronomy)
- Rotational speed
- Stellar rotation
- Synodic day
