= Solar coordinate systems =

Methods to identify locations on the Sun

In solar observation and imaging, coordinate systems are used to identify and communicate locations on and around the Sun. The Sun is made of plasma, so there are no permanent demarcated points that can be referenced.

== Background ==
The Sun is a rotating sphere of plasma at the center of the Solar System. The Sun lacks a solid or liquid surface, so the interface separating its interior and its exterior is usually defined as the boundary where plasma becomes opaque to visible light, the photosphere. Because plasma is gaseous in nature, this surface has no permanent demarcated points that can be used for reference. Furthermore, its rate of rotation varies with latitude, rotating faster at the equator than at the poles.

The Sun's rotation defines an equatorial plane that is inclined with respect to both the ecliptic plane and the celestial equatorial plane. The orientation of the solar equator and solar rotational axis, which is perpendicular to the equatorial plane, are traditionally defined using the ecliptic values first presented by Richard C. Carrington in 1863. Relative to the ecliptic of date, the orientation of the solar equatorial plane is defined by an inclination of 7.25° and a longitude of the ascending node of 75.76° + 1.397°T_{0} measured from the first point of Aries at T_{0} Julian centuries (36,525 days) from epoch J2000. In the equatorial coordinate system, the solar north pole is specified by a declination of 63.87° and a right ascension of 286.13°.

== Cardinal directions ==
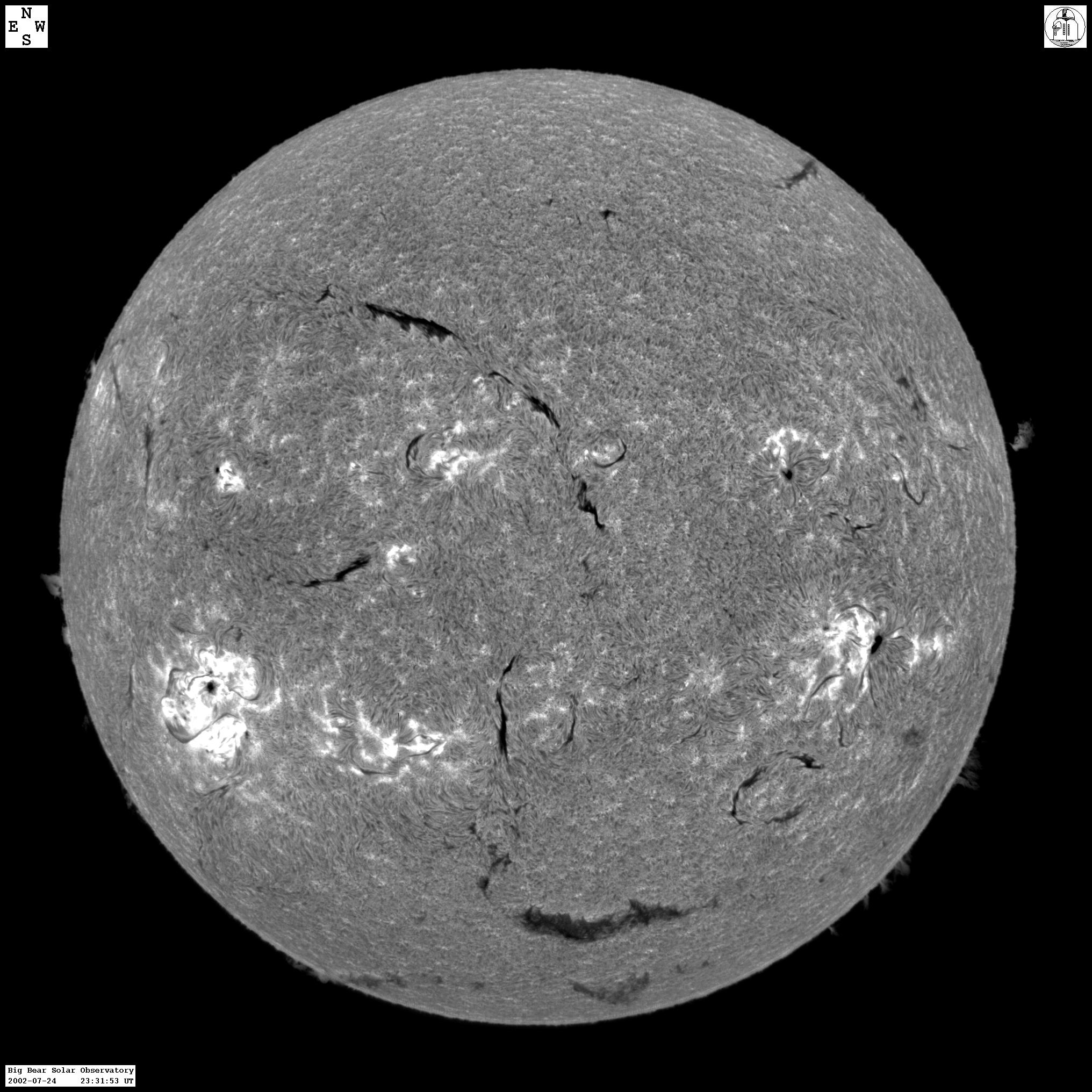
In this image of the Sun's chromosphere, the cardinal directions are indicated by a compass rose in the top-left corner: north is up (↑), west is right (→), south is down (↓), and east is left (←).

In observations of the solar disk, cardinal directions are typically defined so that the Sun's northern and southern hemispheres point toward Earth's northern and southern celestial poles, respectively, and the Sun's eastern and western hemispheres point toward Earth's eastern and western horizons, respectively. In this scheme, clockwise from north at 90° intervals one encounters west, south, and east, and the direction of solar rotation is from east to west.

== Heliographic ==
Heliographic coordinate systems measure positions on the Sun's surface using longitude and latitude. The two most commonly used systems are the Stonyhurst and Carrington systems. They both define latitude as the angle measured from the solar equator but differ in how they define longitude. In Stonyhurst coordinates, the longitude is fixed for an observer on Earth, and, in Carrington coordinates, the longitude rotates with the Sun. In both systems, latitude increases toward solar north and longitude increases toward solar west. Both systems can also be extended to three dimensions by adding the radial distance from the center of the Sun or the height relative to the solar surface.

=== Stonyhurst system ===
The Stonyhurst heliographic coordinate system, developed at Stonyhurst College in the 1800s, has its origin at the point where the solar equator intersects the Sun's central meridian as seen from Earth. Longitude in this system is therefore fixed for observers on Earth.

=== Carrington system ===
The Carrington heliographic coordinate system, established by Richard C. Carrington in 1863, rotates with the Sun at a fixed rate based on the observed rotation of low-latitude sunspots. It rotates with a sidereal period of exactly 25.38 days, which corresponds to a mean synodic period of 27.2753 days.

Whenever the Carrington prime meridian, the line of 0° Carrington longitude, passes the Sun's central meridian as seen from Earth, a new Carrington rotation begins. These rotations are numbered sequentially, with Carrington rotation number 1 starting on 9 November 1853.

== Heliocentric ==
Heliocentric coordinate systems measure spatial positions relative to an origin at the Sun's center. There are four observer-independent heliocentric systems in use: the heliocentric inertial (HCI) system, the heliocentric Aries ecliptic (HAE) system, the heliocentric Earth ecliptic (HEE) system, and the heliocentric Earth equatorial (HEEQ) system. These systems are summarized in the following table. The third axis not presented in the table completes a right-handed Cartesian triad.

Common heliocentric coordinate systems
Name	Abbreviation	+X-axis	+Z-axis
Heliocentric inertial	HCI	Solar ascending node on ecliptic	Solar north pole
Heliocentric Aries ecliptic	HAE	First point of Aries	Ecliptic north pole
Heliocentric Earth ecliptic	HEE	Sun–Earth line	Ecliptic north pole
Heliocentric Earth equator	HEEQ	Intersection between the solar equator and the Sun's central meridian as seen from Earth	Solar north pole

== See also ==
- Astronomical coordinate system
- Ecliptic coordinate system
