= Gristhorpe Man =

Bronze-age burial in Yorkshire, England

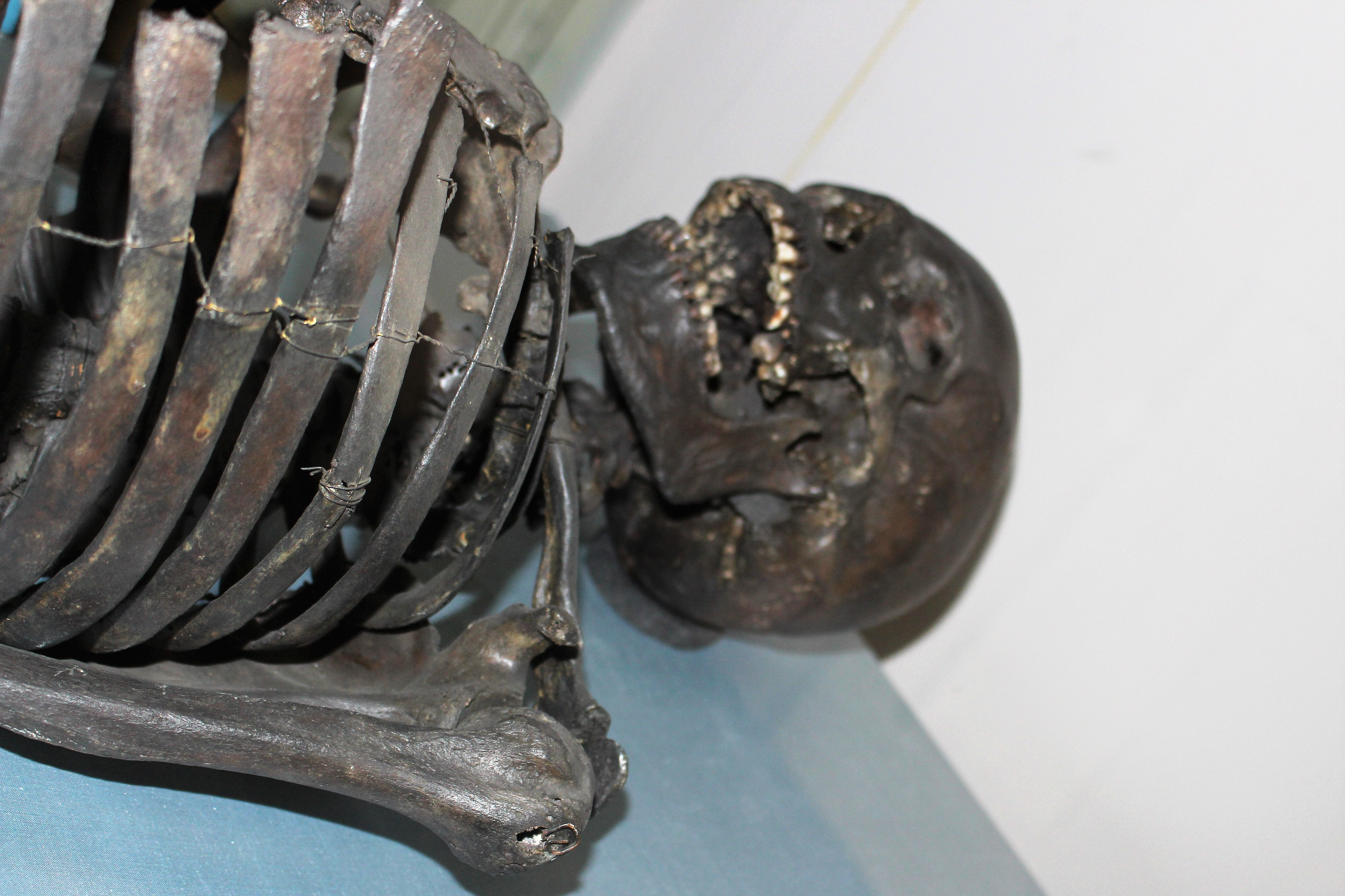
- Died: c. 2000 BC
- Body discovered: 1834 in Gristhorpe, England
- Resting place: Rotunda Museum, England

The remains of Gristhorpe Man (died c. 2000 BC) were found buried in a coffin in Gristhorpe, North Yorkshire, England. They have been identified as a Bronze Age warrior chieftain. A few other examples of burial in a scooped-out oak tree have been found in Scotland and East Anglia, but it was an unusual method of inhumation in the United Kingdom and the remains found near Scarborough, are the best preserved. The remains were discovered in 1834 in a burial mound near Gristhorpe and excavated under the auspices of the Scarborough Philosophical Society. The Bronze Age remains were originally donated to the Rotunda Museum in Scarborough and a report of the excavation was published in the same year by the precocious 17-year-old William Williamson, the son of the Museum curator. They were taken to Bradford in 2005 for a new evaluation directed by Drs. Nigel Melton and Janet Montgomery, while the museum was being refurbished.

== Recent findings ==
The Bradford team deduced that the man was a high status individual, not unlike a tribal chieftain judging by his height of six feet. Growing to such a height may well have been because of a relatively good diet, an indication of good social standing. He also boasts a nearly-full set of teeth in remarkable condition. Other clues to his status come from the grave goods. There were a lot of artefacts. The body was wrapped in a skin cloak, of which only fragments survive. There was a bronze dagger, a bark vessel that was sealed in some way, flint tools, hair from the hide and a wicker basket containing food residue. The individual was of advanced age and seems to have died from natural causes. There were a few healed fractures, consistent with the life of a warrior.

Much of what was dug up in 1834 has not survived. There was a lot of fatty material, probably from degraded body tissues, in the watery coffin which had dried out. The bones were discoloured by the reaction of iron in the water with the tannin in the bark of the coffin and the skeleton was originally preserved by boiling it in glue in a laundry copper. This ruined any chance by archaeologists to do a DNA study but collagen was able to be used from the skeleton for both dating and dietary isotope purposes. Several radiocarbon dates from the tree rings of the oak coffin and the composition of a ceremonial bronze dagger helped confirm the dating making this burial one of the best dated Early Bronze Age burials in Britain. Dendrochronological dating was attempted but the sequence remains floating until further finds from the period can be dated. Metallurgical and lead isotope analyses of the bronze dagger blade indicate that Ireland is likely to be the ultimate source of the copper ore used, but that it had been recycled with other ores being introduced. The original 1834 illustration of the blade appears to depict a scabbard that is no longer present. Scanning electron microscopy detected traces of animal collagen on the blade, confirming the former presence of a scabbard or sheath. The pommel of the dagger was fashioned from whalebone. The flint knife provided evidence of it having been hafted and re-sharpened twice. Microwear analysis indicated that it had been used to work hides and cut meat.

The recent work has permitted comparison with radiocarbon dates from other British examples, as well as with the series of dendrochronological dates obtained from Bronze Age tree-trunk coffin burials which have been excavated in Denmark where such burials are much more common. Isotopic analysis of a tooth has indicated he is likely to have originated from the Scarborough area and ate a lot of meat throughout his life. Radiocarbon dating of the tooth dentine and thigh bone undertaken at Bradford University has shown that he died around 2000 BC.

Dr Alan Ogden, an osteologist at Bradford University, has completed what is thought to be a first in forensic archaeology by reconstructing Gristhorpe Man’s face and making him ‘talk’ using computer software. A possible cause of disability if not death for Gristhorpe Man was ascertained during CT-scanning at St Luke's Hospital in Bradford. The researchers found that he had a brain tumour growing on the left side of his skull which may well have led to him suddenly collapsing and possibly epilepsy.

The remains are not on display and held by the Rotunda Museum in Scarborough alongside details of the new insights and findings into his life. Gristhorpe Man has made an appearance in Michael Portillo's Great British Railway Journeys when Portillo visited Scarborough. Details of the project and new findings have been published in Current Archaeology (Vol. 250 2011) and Antiquity (Vol. 84 No. 325 2010) and a book of the full project and scientific analyses undertaken "Gristhorpe Man: a life and death in the Bronze Age" edited by Nigel Melton, Janet Montgomery and Christopher Knüsel was published in 2014.
