= Richard Christopher Carrington =

English astronomer (1826–1875)

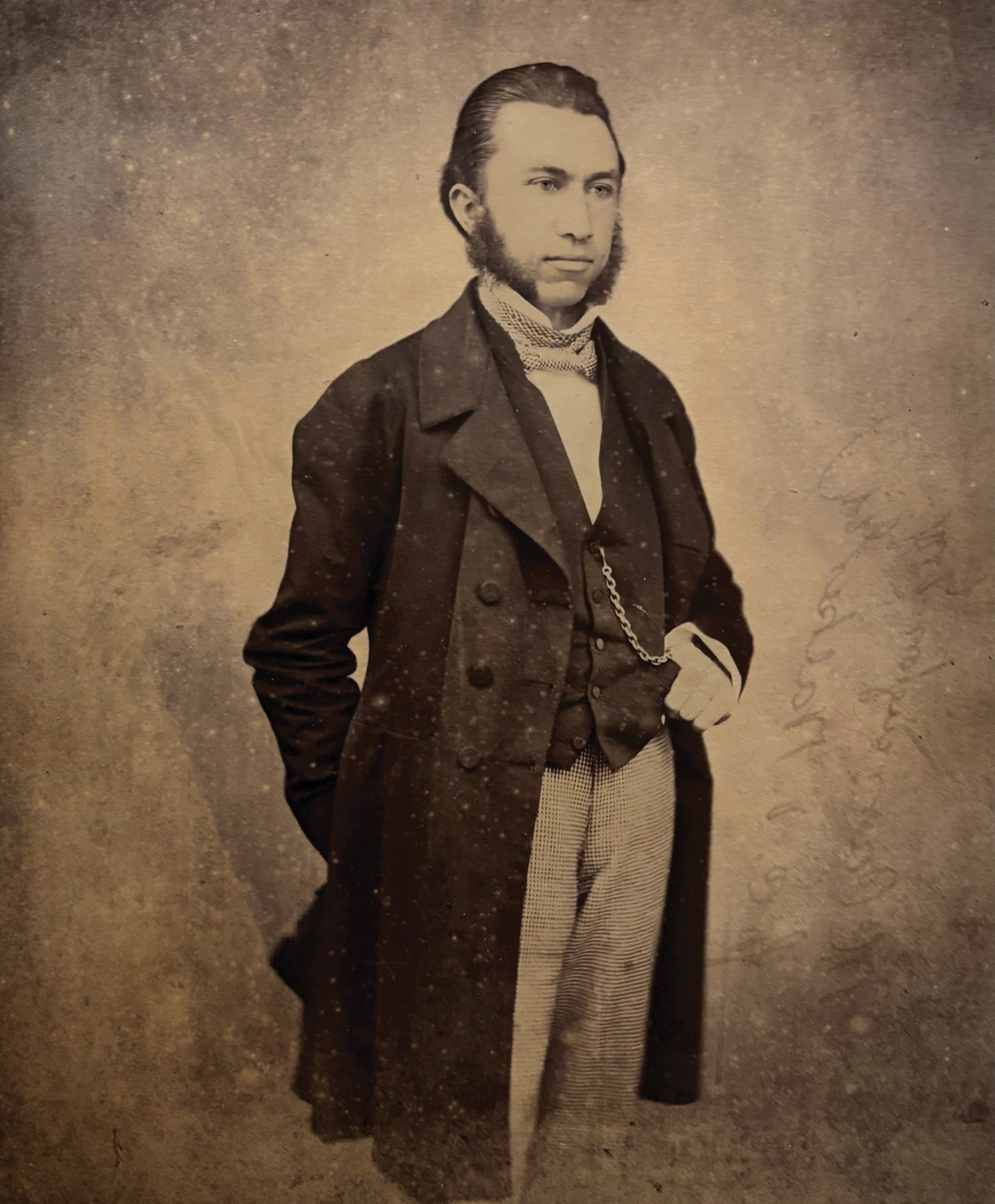
- Only known photograph of Carrington
- Born: 26 May 1826; Chelsea, London, England
- Died: 27 November 1875 (aged 49); Churt, England
- Education: Trinity College, Cambridge
- Known for: Solar observations, including the Carrington Event
- Spouse: Rosa Ellen Jeffries (1845–1875, m. 1869)
- Awards: Gold Medal of the Royal Astronomical Society (1859); Lalande Prize (1864)
- Scientific career
- Fields: Astronomy
- Workplaces: Durham University Observatory

Richard Christopher Carrington (26 May 1826 – 27 November 1875) was an English astronomer whose 1859 astronomical observations demonstrated the existence of solar flares as well as suggesting their electrical influence upon the Earth and its aurorae; and whose 1863 records of sunspot observations revealed the differential rotation of the Sun.

== Life ==
Carrington was born at Chelsea, the second son of Richard Carrington, the proprietor of a large brewery at Brentford, and his wife Esther Clarke Aplin. He entered Trinity College, Cambridge, in 1844; but, though destined for the church, rather by his father's than by his own desire, his scientific tendencies gradually prevailed, and received a final impulse towards practical astronomy from Professor Challis's lectures on the subject. This change in the purpose of his life was unopposed, and he had the prospect of ample means; so that it was purely with the object of gaining experience that he applied, shortly after taking his degree as thirty-sixth wrangler in 1848, for the post of observer in the University of Durham. He entered upon his duties there in October 1849, but soon became dissatisfied with their narrow scope. The observatory was ill supplied with instruments, and the leisure left him for study served only to widen his aims. Friedrich Bessel's and Friedrich Wilhelm Argelander's star-zones, above all, struck him as a model for imitation, and he resolved to complete them by extending them to the pole. Desirous of advancing so far beyond his predecessors as to include in his survey stars of the tenth magnitude, he vainly applied for a suitable instrument, and at last, hopeless of accomplishing any part of his design at Durham, or of benefiting by any further stay, he resigned his position there in March 1852. He had not, however, been idle. Some of his observations, especially of minor planets and comets, made with a Fraunhofer equatorial of 6½ inches aperture, had been published, in a provisional state, in the 'Monthly Notices' and 'Astronomische Nachrichten,' and the whole were definitively embodied in a volume entitled 'Results of Astronomical Observations made at the Observatory of the University, Durham, from October 1849 to April 1852’ (Durham, 1855). His admission as a member of the Royal Astronomical Society (RAS), 14 March 1851, conveyed a prompt recognition of his exceptional merits as an observer.

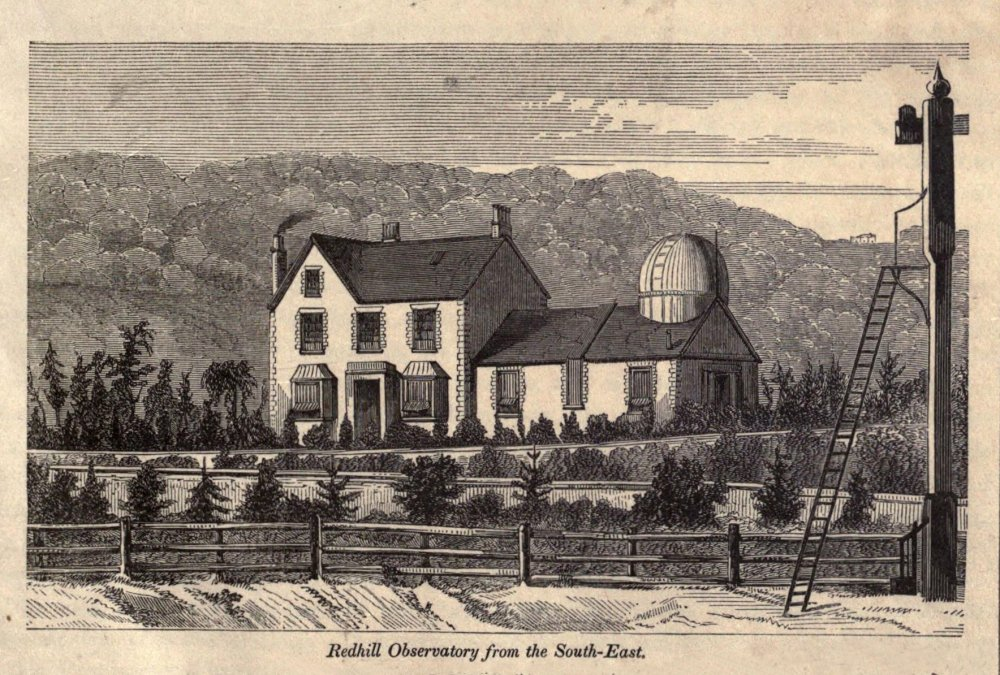
Carrington's house and observatory on Furze Hill, Redhill, Surrey (between 1852 and 1857)

In June 1852 he fixed upon a site for an observatory and dwelling-house at Redhill, Surrey. In July 1853 a transit-circle of 5½ feet focus, reduced in scale from the Greenwich model, and an equatorial of 4½ inches aperture, both by Simms, were in their places, and work was begun. On 9 December 1853, Carrington presented to the RAS, as the result of a preliminary survey, printed copies of nine draft maps, containing all stars down to the eleventh magnitude within 9° of the Pole (Monthly Notices, xiv. 40). Three years' steady pursuance of the adopted plan produced, in 1857, 'A Catalogue of 3,735 Circumpolar Stars observed at Redhill in the years 1854, 1855, and 1856, and reduced to Mean Positions for 1855.' The work was printed at public expense, the decision to that effect by the Lords of the Admiralty rendering unnecessary the acceptance of Leverrier's handsome offer to include it in the next forthcoming volume of the 'Annales' of the Paris observatory. It was rewarded with the Gold Medal of the Royal Astronomical Society, in presenting which, 11 February 1859, Mr. Main dwelt upon the eminent utility of the design, as well as the 'standard excellence' of its execution (ib. xix. 162). It included a laborious comparison of Schwerd's places for 680 stars with those obtained at Redhill, and an elaborate dissertation on the whole theory of corrections as applied to stars near the pole. Ten corresponding maps, copper-engraved, accompanied the catalogue.

Meanwhile, Carrington had adopted, and was cultivating with his usual felicity of treatment, a 'second subject' at that juncture of peculiar interest and importance. While his new observatory was in course of construction, he devoted some of his spare time to examining the drawings and records of sunspots in possession of the RAS, and was much struck with the need and scarcity of systematic solar observations. Sabine's and Wolf's discovery of the coincidence between the magnetic and sunspot periods had just then been announced, and he believed he should be able to take advantage of the pre-occupation or inability of other observers to appropriate to himself, by 'close and methodical research,' the next ensuing eleven-year cycle. He accordingly resolved to devote his daylight energies to the Sun, while reserving his nights for the stars. Solar physics as a whole, however, he prudently excluded from his field of view. He limited his task to fixing the true period of the Sun's rotation (of which curiously discrepant values had been obtained), to tracing the laws of distribution of maculæ, and investigating the existence of permanent surface-currents. Adequately to compass these ends, new devices of observation, reduction, and comparison were required. Leaving photography to his successors as too undeveloped for immediate use, he chose a method founded on the idea of making the solar disc its own circular micrometer. An image of the Sun was thrown upon a screen placed at such a distance from the eyepiece of the 4½-inch equatorial as to give to the disc a diameter of 12 to 14 inches. In the focus of the telescope, which was firmly clamped, two bars of flattened gold wire were fastened at right angles to each other, and inclined about 45° on either side of the meridian. Then, as the inverted image traversed the screen, the instants of contact with the wires of the Sun's limbs and of the spot-nucleus to be measured were severally noted, when an easy calculation gave its heliocentric position (ib. xiv. 153).

In this manner, during seven and a half years, 5,290 observations were made of 954 separate groups, many of which were besides accurately depicted in drawings. By the sudden death of his father, however, in July 1858, and the consequent devolution upon Carrington of the management of the brewery, the complete execution of his project of research was frustrated. He continued for some time to supervise the solar work he had previously carried on in person; but in March 1861, seeing no prospect of release from commercial engagements, he thought it advisable to close the series. The results appeared in a quarto volume, the publication of which was aided by a grant from the Royal Society. Its title ran as follows: Observations of the Spots on the Sun from November 9, 1853, to March 24, 1861, made at Redhill (London, 1863). Never were data more opportunely furnished. Perhaps more effectually than the pronouncements of spectrum analysis, they served to revolutionise ideas on solar physics.

Efforts to ascertain the true rate of solar rotation had been continually baffled by what were called the 'proper motions' of the spots serving as indexes to it. Carrington showed that these were in reality due to a great 'bodily drift' of the photosphere, diminishing apparently from the equator to the poles (ib. xix. 81). There was, then, no single period ascertainable through observations of the solar surface. By equatorial spots the circuit was found to be performed in about two and a half days less than by spots at the (ordinarily) extreme north and south limits of 45°. The assumed 'mean period' of 25.38 solar days applied, in fact, only to two zones 14° from the equator; nearer to it the time of rotation was shorter, further from it longer, than the average. Carrington succeeded in representing the daily movement of a spot in any heliographical latitude l, by the empirical expression 865′ ± 165 . sin 7/4 (l – 1°). But he attempted no explanation of the phenomenon. It formed, however, the basis of Faye's theory (1865) of the Sun as a gaseous body ploughed through by vertical currents, which finally superseded Herschel's idea of a flame-enveloped, but cool, dark, and even habitable globe.

Carrington's determinations of the elements of the Sun's rotation are still of standard authority. The inclination of the solar equator to the plane of the ecliptic he fixed at 7° 15′; the longitude of the ascending node at 73° 40′ (both for 1850) . A peculiarity in the distribution of sunspots detected by him about the time of the minimum of 1856, afforded, as he said, 'an instructive instance of the regular irregularity and the irregular regularity' characterising solar phenomena (ib. xix. 1). As the minimum approached, the belts of disturbance gradually contracted towards and died out near the equator; shortly after which two fresh series broke out, as if by a completely new impulse, in comparatively high latitudes, and spread equatorially. No satisfactory rationale of this curious procedure has yet been arrived at. It is, nevertheless, intimately related to the course of sunspot development, since Wolf found evidence of a similar behaviour in Böhm's observations of 1833–6, and it was perceived by Spörer and Secchi to recur in 1867.

While still in his apprenticeship at Durham, Carrington repaired to Sweden on the occasion of the total solar eclipse of 28 July 1851, and made at Lilla Edet, on the Göta river, observations printed in the Memoirs of the Royal Astronomical Society (xxi. 58). The experience thus gained was turned to public account in the compilation of Information and Suggestions addressed to Persons who may be able to place themselves within the Shadow of the Total Eclipse of the Sun on September 7, 1858, a brochure printed and circulated by the lords of the admiralty in May 1858. The eclipse to which it referred was visible in South America. A visit to the continent in 1856 gave him the opportunity of drawing up a valuable report on the condition of a number of German observatories (Monthly Notices, xvii. 43), and of visiting Schwabe at Dessau, to whose merits he drew explicit attention, and to whom, in the following year, he had the pleasure of transmitting the Gold Medal of the RAS. He fulfilled with great diligence the duties of secretary to that body, 1857–62, and was elected a fellow of the Royal Society on 7 June 1860.

=== The great solar storm of 1859 ===
Carrington, independently with fellow astronomer Richard Hodgson, were documenting sunspots and directly witnessed the extraordinary solar outburst of 1 September 1859. Carrington and Hodgson compiled independent reports which were published side by side in the Monthly Notices of the Royal Astronomical Society, and exhibited their drawings of the event at the November 1859 meeting of the Royal Astronomical Society.

The geomagnetic solar flare hit the Earth the following days, the main body of which fell over the American continents. In these early days of electrical communication, the telegraph systems was the most affected. Lines all over Europe and North America failed, in some cases giving telegraph operators electric shocks. Telegraph pylons threw sparks. Some telegraph operators could continue to send and receive messages despite having disconnected their power supplies. Based on Carrington's observation of the solar storm, this event now bears the name of the Carrington Event, and events of similar magnitude are classified as "Carrington-class" events.

=== Late life and demise ===
But the lease by which he held his powers of useful work was unhappily running out. A severe attack of illness in 1865 left his health permanently impaired. In 1869, he married Rosa Ellen Jeffries (1845–75), and, having disposed of the brewery, he retired to Churt, Surrey, where, on the top of an isolated conical hill, 60 feet high, locally known as the Middle Devil's Jump, in a lonely and picturesque spot, he built a new observatory (ib. xxx. 43). Its chief instrument was a large altazimuth on Steinheil's principle, but there are no records of observations made with it. He no longer attended the meetings of the RAS, and his last communication to it, 10 January 1873, was on the subject of a 'double altazimuth' of great size which he had thoughts of erecting (ib. xxxiii. 118).

A deplorable tragedy, however, supervened. On the morning of 17 November 1875 his wife was found dead in her bed, as it seemed, through an overdose of chloral. The event, combined perhaps with the censure on a supposed deficiency of proper nursing precautions conveyed by the verdict of the coroner's jury, tolled heavily on her husband's spirits. He left his house on the day of the inquest, and returned to it after a week's absence, only to find it deserted by his servants. He was seen to enter it on 27 November, but was never again seen alive. After a time some neighbour gave the alarm, the doors were broken open, and his dead body was found extended on a mattress locked into a remote apartment. A poultice of tea-leaves was tied over the left ear, as if for the relief of pain, and a post-mortem examination showed death to have resulted from an effusion of blood on the brain. A verdict of 'sudden death from natural causes' was returned.

=== Legacy ===
Carrington's manuscript books of sunspot observations and reductions, with a folio volume of drawings, were purchased after his death by Lord Lindsay (later Earl of Crawford), and presented to the Royal Astronomical Society (ib. xxxvi. 249). To the same body Carrington bequeathed a sum of £2,000. Among his numerous contributions to scientific collections may be mentioned a paper 'On the Distribution of the Perihelia of the Parabolic and Hyperbolic Comets in relation to the Motion of the Solar System in Space,' read before the Astronomical Society, 14 December 1860 (Mem. R. A. Soc. xxix. 355). The result, like that of Mohn's contemporaneous investigation, proved negative, and was thought to be, through uncontrolled conditions, nugatory; yet it perhaps conveyed an important truth as to the original connection of comets with the solar system.

The only known photograph of him was discovered by Kate Bond of the Royal Astronomical Society in 2026. Carrington crater on the Moon is named after him.

== Work ==
Even though he did not discover the 11-year sunspot activity cycle, Carrington's observations of sunspot activity after he heard about Heinrich Schwabe's work led to the numbering of the cycles with Carrington's name. For example, the sunspot maximum of 2002 was Carrington Cycle No. 23.

Carrington also determined the elements of the rotation axis of the Sun, based on sunspot motions, and his results remain in use today. Carrington rotation is a system for measuring solar longitude based on his observations of the low-latitude solar rotation rate.

Carrington made the initial observations leading to the establishment of Spörer's law.

Carrington won the Gold Medal of the Royal Astronomical Society (RAS) in 1859.

Carrington also won the Lalande Prize of the French Academy of Sciences in 1864, for his Observations of Spots on the Sun from 9 November 1853 to 24 March 1861, Made at Redhill. This award was not reported in the Monthly Notices of the Royal Astronomical Society, probably due to Carrington's bitter, acrimonious and public criticism of Cambridge University over the appointment of John Couch Adams, Lowndean Professor of Astronomy and Geometry, as the non-observing Director of the Cambridge Observatory. As a measure of displeasure Carrington withdrew Observations from official considerations of the RAS for what would likely have been the book's second gold medal, for the year 1865.

=== Carrington super flare ===
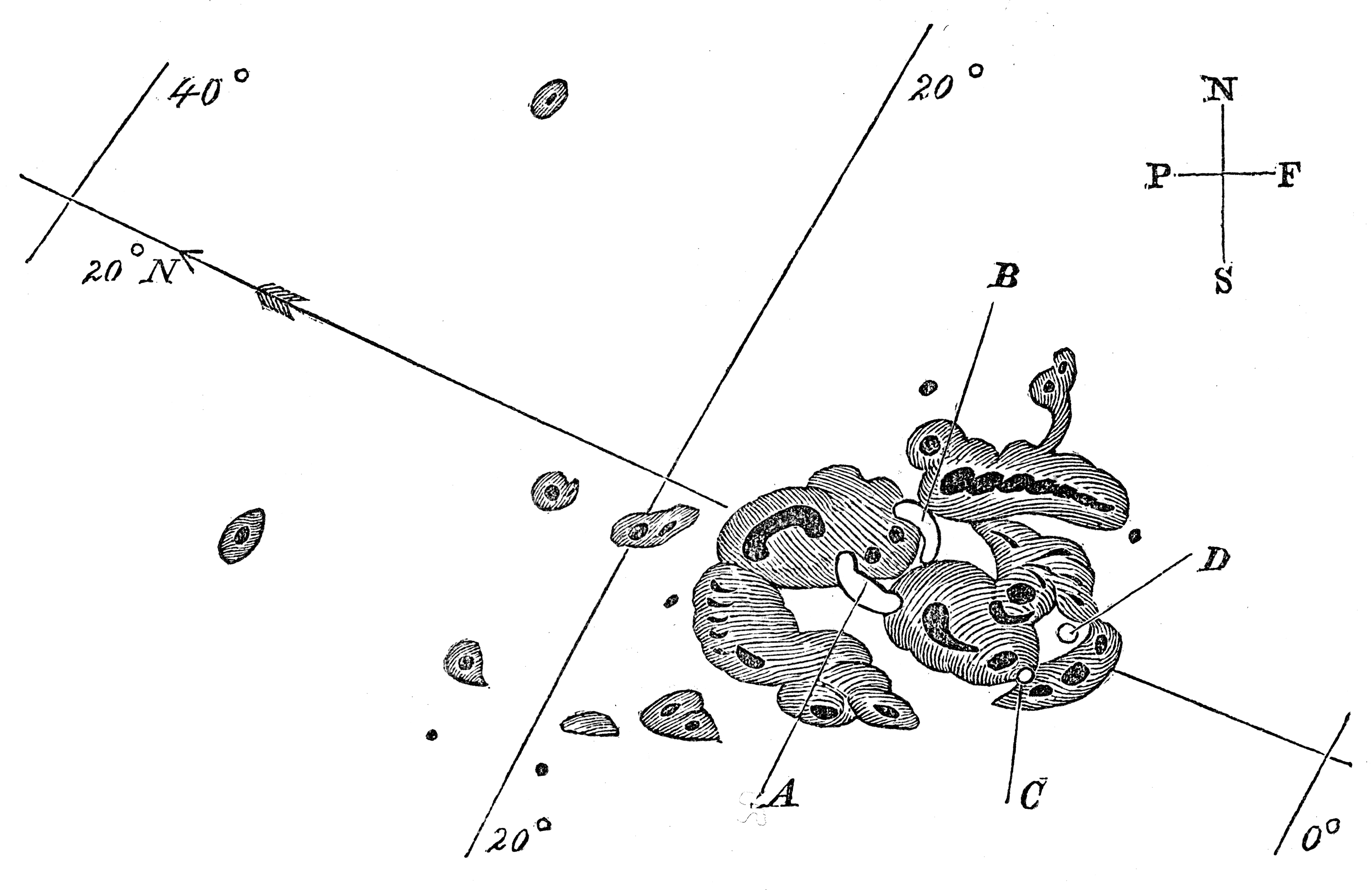
Sunspots of 1 September 1859 as sketched by Richard Carrington

On 1 September 1859, Carrington and Richard Hodgson, another English astronomer, independently made the first observations of a solar flare. Because of a simultaneous "crochet" observed in the Kew Observatory magnetometer record by Balfour Stewart and a geomagnetic storm observed the following day, Carrington suspected a solar-terrestrial connection. For this reason, the geomagnetic storm of 1859 is often called the Carrington Event. Worldwide reports on the effects of the geomagnetic storm of 1859 were compiled and published by Elias Loomis which supported the observations of Carrington and Balfour Stewart.

== Selected writings ==
- Carrington, Richard Christopher (1855), Results of Astronomical Observations Made at the Observatory of the University, Durham ..., Durham: W. E. Duncan and Son
- Carrington, Richard Christopher (1857), Catalogue of 3735 Circumpolar Stars, Longman, Brown, Green, and Longmans
- Carrington, R. C. (1859), "Description of a Singular Appearance seen in the Sun on September 1, 1859", Monthly Notices of the Royal Astronomical Society, 20: 13–15, Bibcode:1859MNRAS..20...13C, doi:10.1093/mnras/20.1.13
- Carrington, Richard Christopher (1863), Observations of the Spots on the Sun from 1853 to 1861 (1863) Williams and Norgate
