= Listed buildings in Gristhorpe =

Gristhorpe is a civil parish in the county of North Yorkshire, England. It contains three listed buildings that are recorded in the National Heritage List for England. All the listed buildings are designated at Grade II, the lowest of the three grades, which is applied to "buildings of national importance and special interest". The parish contains the village of Gristhorpe and the surrounding area. All the listed buildings are in the village, and consist of a house, its associated coach house and stables, and a farmhouse.

== Buildings ==
Name and location	Photograph	Date	Notes
Manor Farmhouse; 54.22137°N 0.33627°W	—	1665	The house, which was extended in 1747, is in whitewashed sandstone with a pantile roof. There are two storeys at the front and one at the rear, three bays, and a rear outshut. The windows are casements, those in the right two bays with keystones, and a fire window, also with a keystone. Above the doorway is a round-headed recessed datestone in an architrave, and under that is another datestone with initials.
Gristhorpe Hall; 54.22111°N 0.33407°W	—	Mid 18th century	The house, which was later extended, is in limestone, rendered and whitewashed on the street front, with a stone slate roof. The street front has two storeys quoins, modillion eaves, and stone gable coping. There are three bays, and a later bay to the left. The right bay is gabled and quoined, and has a Doric portico with a modillion cornice, an entablature and a pediment, above which is an oculus. The garden front has two storeys and an attic, a floor band, coped gables and kneelers. There are three bays, and single-bay flanking extensions, and it contains a full-height canted bay window, with a doorway approached by steps. The windows on both fronts are sashes, those on the garden front with tripartite keystones.
Coach house, Gristhorpe Hall; 54.22128°N 0.33388°W	—	Early 19th century	The coach house and stables to the northeast of the house are in whitewashed sandstone, with chamfered quoins, and a pantile roof with a coped gable end facing the street. There is one storey and a loft, and the gable end contains an elliptical arch of chamfered voussoirs with a chamfered quoined surround.
