= Balfour Stewart =

Scottish physicist and meteorologist (1828–1887)

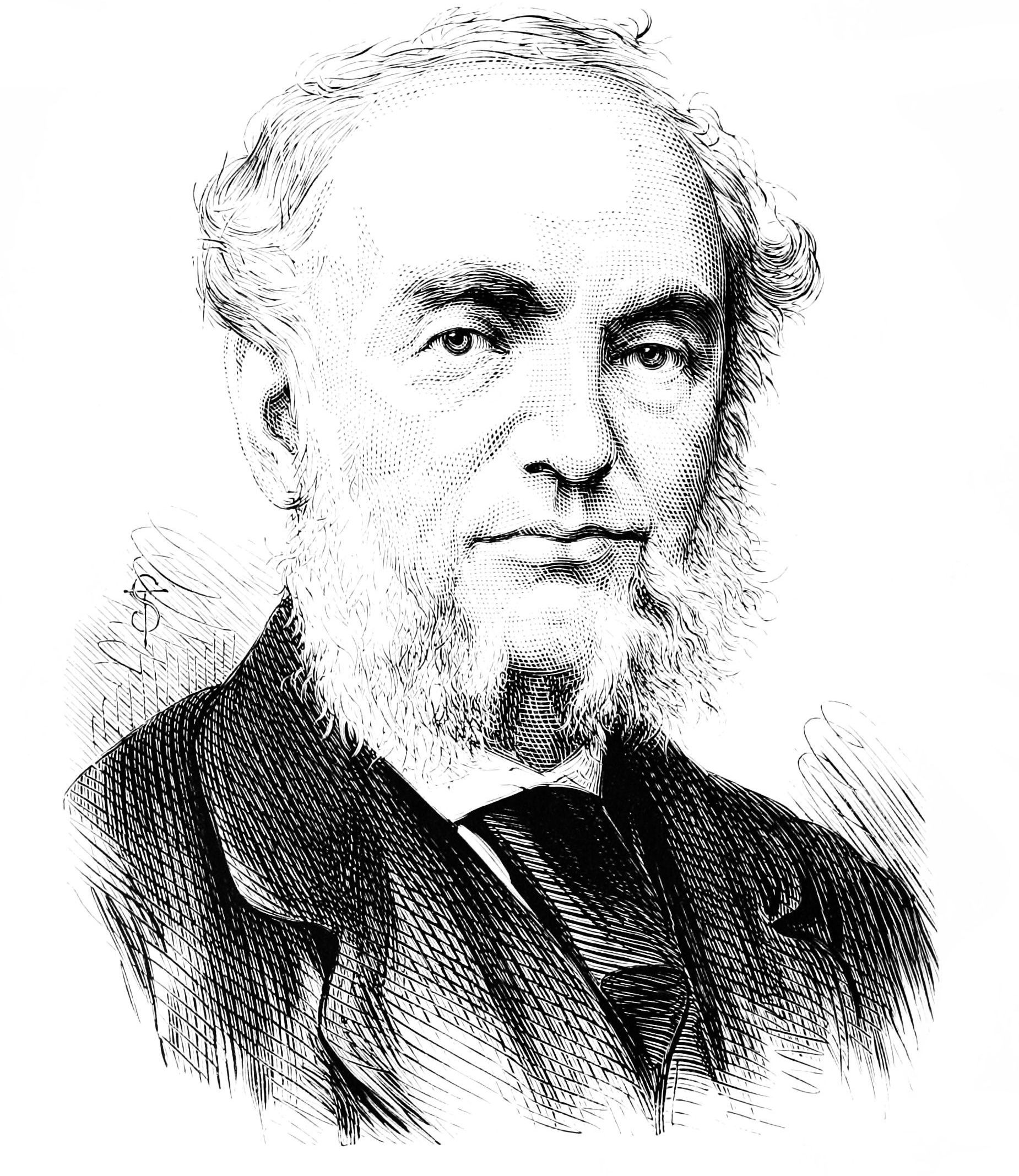
- Born: 1 November 1828; Edinburgh, Scotland
- Died: 19 December 1887 (aged 59); Ballymagarvey, Balrath, County Meath, Ireland
- Citizenship: British
- Education: University of St. Andrews, University of Edinburgh
- Known for: Heat; Meteorology; Terrestrial magnetism
- Awards: Rumford Medal (1868)
- Scientific career
- Fields: Physics; Meteorology
- Workplaces: Kew Observatory (1859–70); Owens College (1870–87)
- Doctoral advisor: James David Forbes
- Other academic advisors: James David Forbes
- Notable students: J. J. Thomson

Balfour Stewart (1 November 1828 – 19 December 1887) was a Scottish physicist and meteorologist.

His studies in the field of radiant heat led to him receiving the Rumford Medal of the Royal Society in 1868. In 1859 he was appointed director of Kew Observatory. He was elected professor of physics at Owens College, Manchester, and was the first holder of the prestigious Langworthy chair that he retained until his death on 19 December 1887. He was the author of several successful science textbooks, and also of the article on "Terrestrial Magnetism" in the ninth edition of the Encyclopædia Britannica.

== Career ==
Stewart was born on 1 November 1828 at 1 London Row in Leith (north of Edinburgh), the son of William Stewart a tea merchant, and his wife, Jane Clouston. His father was involved in business in Great Britain and Australia.

He was educated at Dundee. He then studied physics at the University of St Andrews, and the University of Edinburgh. Following his studies of physics at Edinburgh, he became assistant to James David Forbes in 1856. Forbes was especially interested in questions of heat, meteorology, and terrestrial magnetism, and it was to these that Stewart also mainly devoted himself.

Radiant heat first claimed his attention, and by 1858 he had completed his first investigations into the subject. These yielded a remarkable extension of Pierre Prévost's "Law of Exchanges," and enabled him to establish the fact that radiation is not a surface phenomenon, but takes place throughout the interior of the radiating body, and that the radiative and absorptive powers of a substance must be equal, not only for the radiation as a whole, but also for every constituent of it.

In recognition of this work, he received in 1868 the Rumford Medal of the Royal Society, into which he had been elected six years before. Of other papers in which he dealt with this and kindred branches of physics may be mentioned "Observations with a Rigid Spectroscope," "Heating of a Disc by Rapid Motion in Vacuo," "Thermal Equilibrium in an Enclosure Containing Matter in Visible Motion," and "Internal Radiation in Uniaxal Crystals."

In 1859 he was appointed director of Kew Observatory, and there naturally became interested in problems of meteorology and terrestrial magnetism. In 1870, the year in which he was very seriously injured in a railway accident, he was elected professor of physics at Owens College, Manchester. He was elected to membership of the Manchester Literary and Philosophical Society on 1 November 1870 and was President of the Society 1887–88. He retained the physics chair until his death, which happened near Drogheda, in Ireland, on 19 December 1887.

He was the author of several successful textbooks of science, and also of the article on "Terrestrial Magnetism" in the ninth edition of the Encyclopædia Britannica. In conjunction with Professor P. G. Tait he wrote The Unseen Universe, at first published anonymously, which was intended to combat the common notion of the incompatibility of science and religion.

A devoted churchman, Stewart was prominently identified with the Society for Psychical Research. It was in his 1875 review of The Unseen Universe, that William James first put forth his Will to Believe Doctrine.

== The Great Geomagnetic Storms of September 1859 ==
Balfour Stewart recorded remarkable geomagnetic disturbances on the evening of 28 August 1859 and the morning of 2 September 1859, at the Kew Observatory, and presented his findings in a paper presented to the Royal Society on 21 November 1861. He noted that while "magnetic disturbances of unusual violence and very wide extent" were recorded in various places around the world, the Kew Observatory had the benefit of self-recording magnetographs, which allowed "the means of obtaining a continuous photographic register of the state of the three elements of the Earth’s magnetic force—namely, the declination, and the horizontal and vertical intensity."

Stewart went on the make the following observation.

I now proceed to notice some of the peculiarities of this magnetic storm.

It appears that we have two distinct well-marked disturbances, each commencing abruptly and ending gradually, the first of which began on the evening of August 28 and the second on the early morning of September 2. These two great disturbances correspond therefore in point of time to the two great auroral displays already alluded to.

The second disturbance resulted from what is now known as the Carrington Event, a large solar flare that Richard Carrington and Richard Hodgson observed telescopically on the morning of 1 September 1859. The first disturbance had no observed solar activity prior to its onset. This could be because the associated solar eruption was either unobserved by optical telescopes at the time of its occurrence, or because the eruption itself did not produce an optical, or "white light", flare like the Carrington flare and was therefore invisible to the optical telescopes in use at the time.

At the 11 November 1859 meeting of the Royal Astronomical Society, Richard Carrington presented a paper describing his observations of the super flare that occurred on 1 September, at 11:18 GMT and later named in his honour. In what appears to be an editorial addition made after the meeting the following observation was appended in parentheses.

(Mr. Carrington exhibited at the November Meeting of the Society a complete diagram of the disk of the sun at the time, and copies of the photographic records of the variations of the three magnetic elements, as obtained at Kew, and pointed out that a moderate but very marked disturbance took place at about 11^{h} 20^{m} A.M., Sept. 1st, of short duration; and that towards four hours after midnight there commenced a great magnetic storm, which subsequent accounts established to be considerable in the southern as in the northern hemisphere. While the contemporary occurrence may deserve noting, he would not have it supposed that he even leans towards hastily connecting them. “One swallow does not make a summer.”)

From this addendum, it is clear that Richard Carrington was not willing to commit professionally to connecting the magnetic disturbance with the event he had observed on the surface of the Sun even though they occurred at nearly identical times. He had indeed displayed the magnetographs at the Royal Astronomical Society meeting. The time of 11:20 GMT is good agreement with other reports but the time of 4:00 GMT on 2 September 1859 for the commencement of the magnetic storm is an hour earlier than reported by Stewart.

Stewart also reported on a smaller magnetic disturbance that occurred at the same time as the white light solar flare observed by Richard Carrington:

But, beside these two remarkable disturbances into which it divided itself, this great storm comprehends a minor disturbance, not approaching these two in extent, but yet possessing an interest peculiar to itself, which entitles it to be mentioned.

On September 1, a little before noon, Mr. R.C. Carrington happened to be observing, by means of a telescope, a large spot which might then be seen on the surface of our luminary, when a remarkable appearance presented itself, which he described in communications to the Royal Astronomical Society.

(Richard Carrington’s paper is then quoted at length.)

On calling at Kew Observatory a day or two afterwards, Mr. Carrington learned that at the very moment when he had observed this phenomenon the three magnetic elements at Kew were simultaneously disturbed. If no connexion had been known to subsist between these two classes of phenomena, it would, perhaps, be wrong to consider this in any other light than a casual coincidence; but since General Sabine has proved that a relation subsists between magnetic disturbances and sun spots, it is not impossible to suppose that in this case our luminary was taken "in the act".

This disturbance occurred as nearly as possible at 11^{h} 15^{m} A.M. Greenwich mean time, on September 1, 1859, affecting all the elements simultaneously, and commencing quite abruptly.

This small, short-duration, disturbance described by Stewart is now understood to be due to a rapid ionization increase and resultant electric currents in the ionosphere due to intense X-ray radiation from the solar flare. Travelling at the speed of light, solar flare X-rays take 8 minutes to travel from the sun to the Earth, and arrive simultaneously with the white light flare photons that Carrington observed. The resulting geomagnetic disturbance from the ionospheric currents occurs nearly simultaneously with the photon arrivals and lasts only for as long as the flare X-ray flux continues to ionize the upper atmosphere. The larger magnetic storm that commenced 17.5 hours after the flare is now understood to be caused by a coronal mass ejection (CME) associated with the eruption that caused the solar flare.

By citing the previous research of Edward Sabine, which established a correlation between sunspots and magnetic storms, Stewart advanced the theory that the event observed by Richard Carrington and the magnetic disturbance that was recorded at the same time were in fact connected. The magnetic phenomena that occurred at about 11:18 GMT on 1 September 1859 are now known as a Solar Flare Effect (SFE) or a Magnetic Crochet, but the connection would not be proven for another 80 years. The SFE is a sudden ionosphere disturbances caused by X-rays and Extreme ultraviolet (EUV) driven enhancement of the ionosphere current vortices responsible for the regular daily variation observed on magnetometer traces. SFE are mostly observed in locations close to the sub-solar point (i.e. the point on Earth when the Sun is overhead) and can only be observed from stations in the sunlit hemisphere at the time of the solar flare. Using Stewart's times, the CME associated with the Carrington Event took 17 hours and 45 minutes to reach the Earth.

Stewart reported that the first geomagnetic storm began at 22:30 GMT on the evening of 28 August 1859, as recorded by self-recording magnetographs at the Kew Observatory. Assuming that the first large geomagnetic storm was caused by a solar eruption similar in scale to the Carrington Event that is known to have caused the second storm, it is interesting to ask if a SFE is evident in the Kew magnetograph records prior to the onset of the second storm. Given that CME speeds can vary widely between solar eruptions, even those with similar-sized flares, the SFE signal may not be 17 hours earlier than the first storm's onset and could be as much as 24–48 hours prior to the storm onset time.

== Bibliography ==
- Elementary Treatise on Heat (1866; sixth edition, revised, 1895)
- Lessons in Elementary Physics (1871, 1886)
- Physics (1872, 1884)
- The Unseen Universe (1875)
- Paradoxical Philosophy: A Sequel to the Unseen Universe (1878)
- The Conservation of Energy (1875; ninth edition, 1900)
- Lessons in Practical Physics with W. H. Gee, (volume i, 1885; volume ii, 1887)
- An Elementary Treatise on Heat (1888)

Academic offices
Preceded by Creation	Langworthy Professor at the University of Manchester; 1874–87	Succeeded by Arthur Schuster
Professional and academic associations
Preceded by Robert Dukinfield Darbishire	President of the Manchester Literary and Philosophical Society; 1887–88	Succeeded by Osborne Reynolds
