= Moseley (crater) =

Lunar impact crater

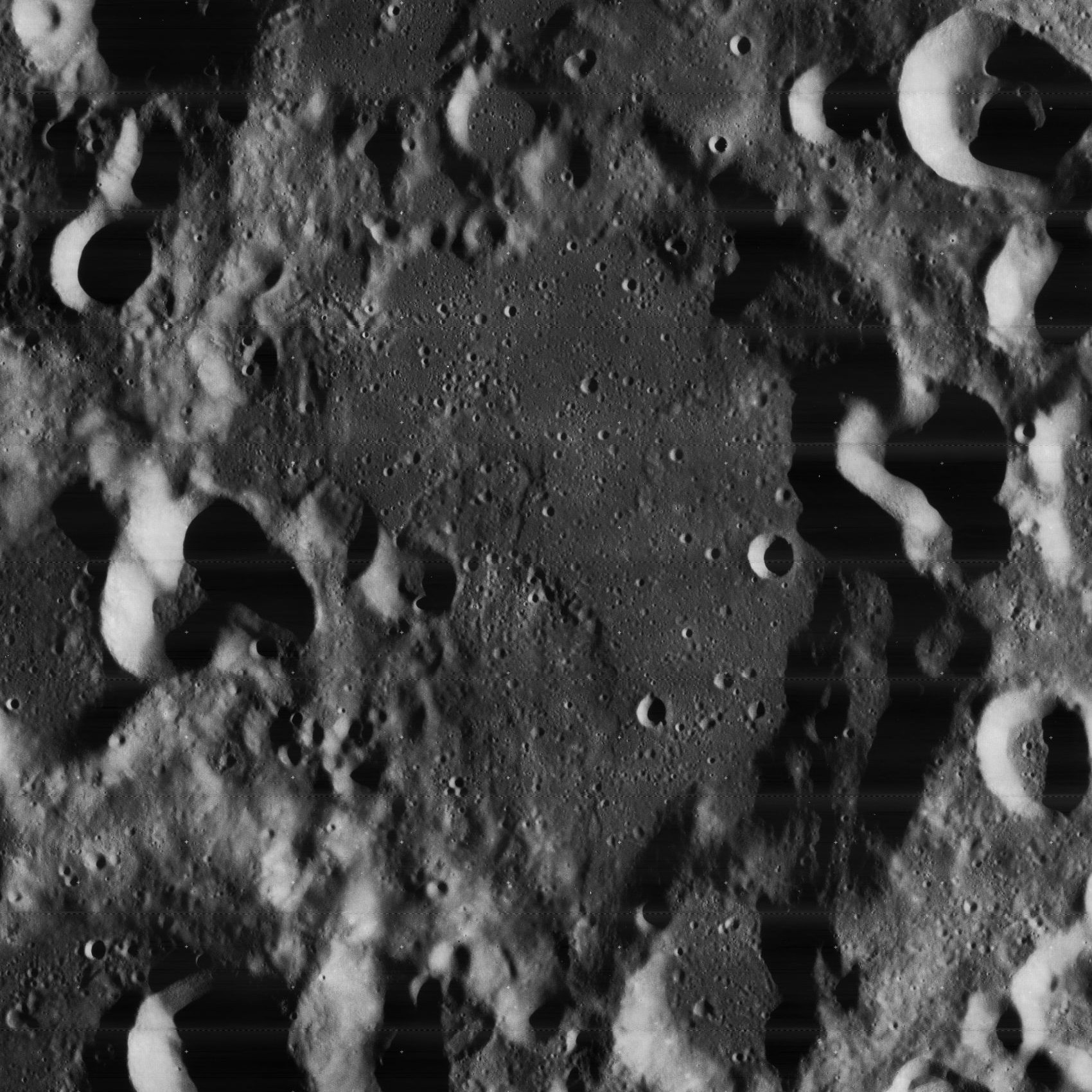
- Lunar Orbiter 4 image
- Coordinates: 20.9°N 90.1°W
- Diameter: 90 km
- Depth: Unknown
- Colongitude: 91° at sunrise
- Eponym: Henry G. J. Moseley

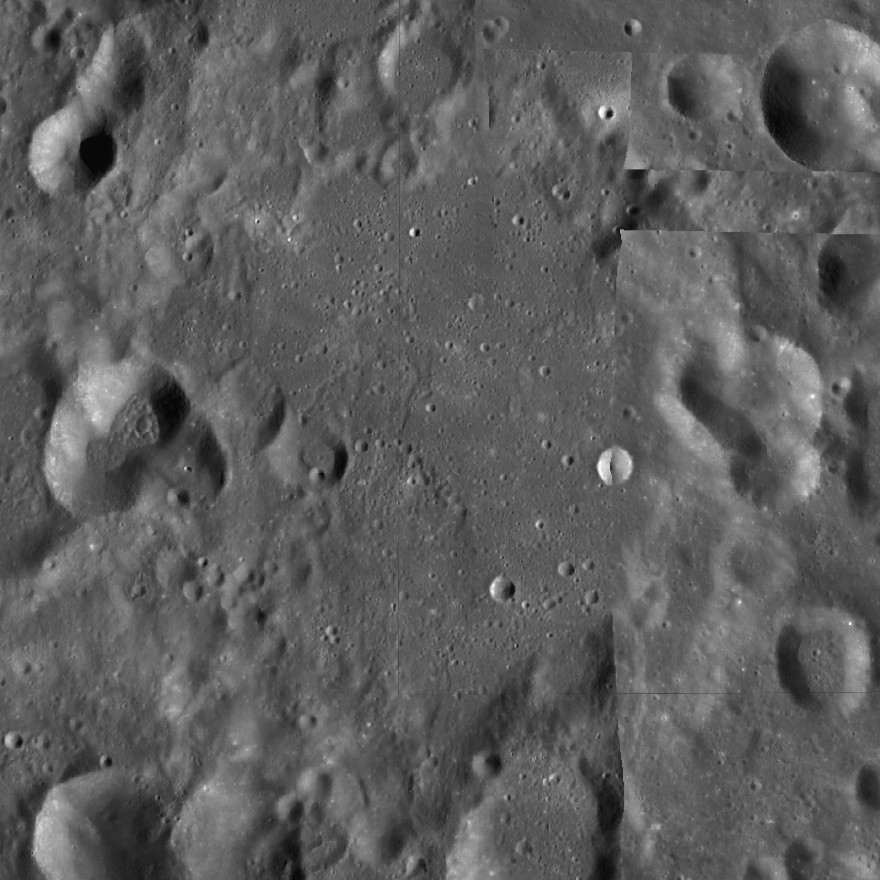
LRO mosaic

Moseley is a worn lunar impact crater that lies along the western limb of the Moon. It lies just to the south of the crater Bartels, and near the north-northeastern rim of Einstein. Due to its location, this crater is viewed side-on from Earth, and not much detail can be seen. It can also become hidden from sight due to the effects of libration.

The outer rim of this feature has been worn and eroded due to subsequent impacts. Little of the original rim remains intact, and the perimeter is generally an irregular circular ridge surrounding the interior floor. In contrast the floor of the crater is relatively level and featureless. There are only a few tiny craterlets marking the surface.

This crater is named after English physicist Henry G. J. Moseley (1887–1915).
