= Bartels (crater) =

Lunar impact crater

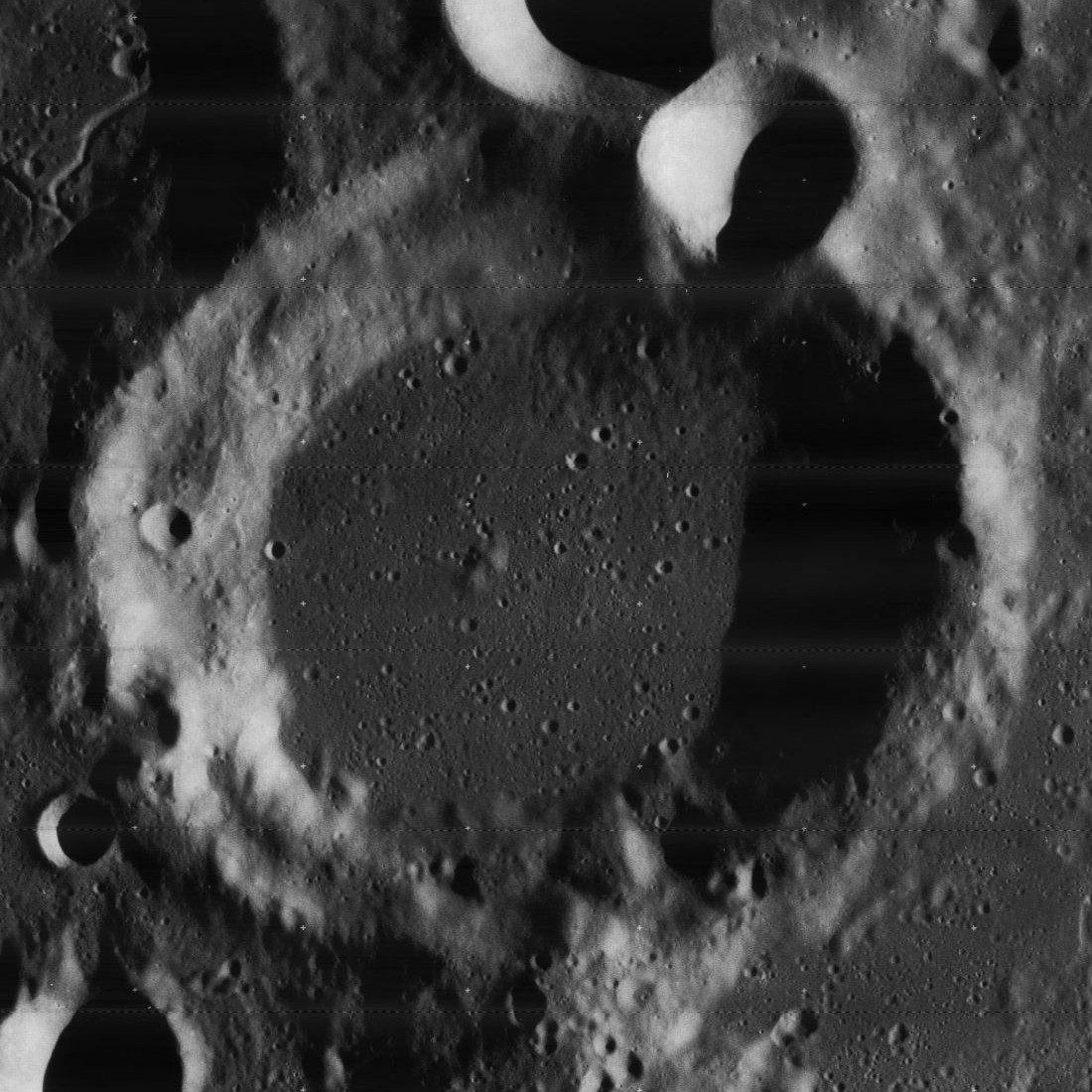
- Lunar Orbiter 4 image
- Coordinates: 24.5°N 89.8°W
- Diameter: 54.95 km (34.14 mi)
- Depth: Unknown
- Colongitude: 90° at sunrise
- Eponym: Julius Bartels

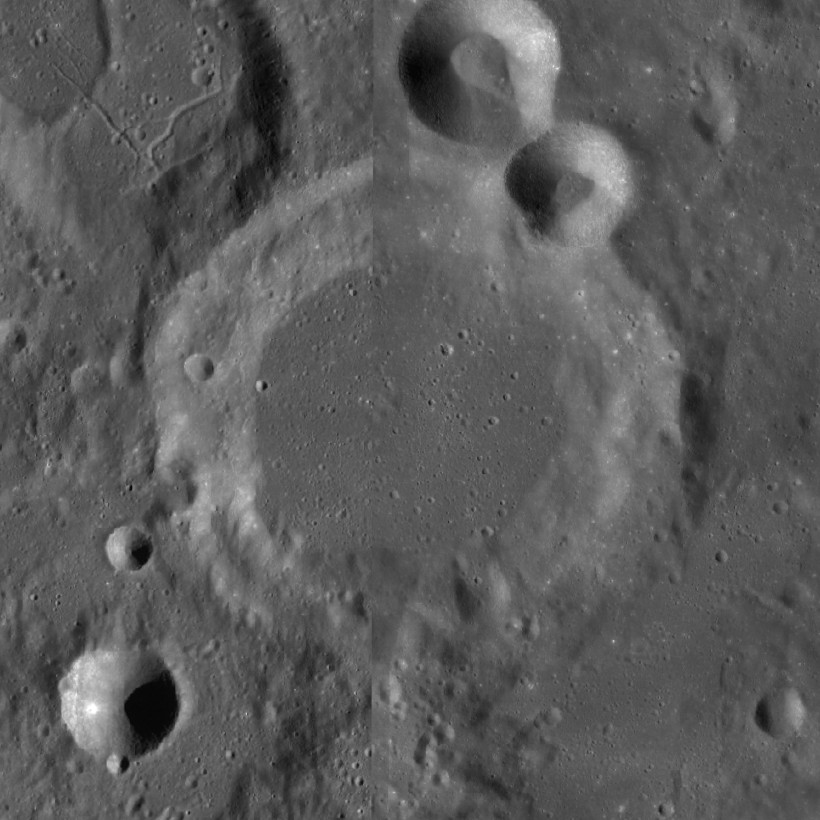
LRO mosaic

Bartels is a lunar impact crater located along the western perimeter of the Moon's visible face. At this location the crater is viewed from the side, and visibility is affected by libration. The crater can be viewed in its entirety only from lunar orbit. It is located to the north of the crater Moseley and south-southeast of Voskresenskiy.

The rim of this crater is worn and eroded, particularly along the southern face and in the northeast where a small crater overlies the rim. Apart from a tiny central peak offset to the west of the midpoint, the interior floor forms a nearly level plain marked by a number of tiny craterlets.

This crater is named after German geophysicist Julius Bartels (1899–1964). Its designation was officially adopted by the International Astronomical Union in 1970.

== Satellite craters ==
By convention these features are identified on lunar maps by placing the letter on the side of the crater midpoint that is closest to Bartels.

Bartels	Latitude	Longitude	Diameter
A	25.7° N	89.6° W	17 km
