= Julius Bartels =

German geophysicist and statistician

Julius Bartels (17 August 1899, Magdeburg – 6 March 1964) was a German geophysicist and statistician who made notable contributions to the physics of the Sun and Moon; to geomagnetism and meteorology; and to the physics of the ionosphere. He also made fundamental contributions to statistical methods for geophysics. Bartels was the first President of the International Association of Geomagnetism and Aeronomy (IAGA). With Sydney Chapman, he wrote the influential book Geomagnetism.

== Life and career ==
Bartels was awarded his Ph.D. from Göttingen in 1923, then worked at the Potsdam magnetic observatory as a post-doctorate. In 1928, he was named professor at Eberswalde, teaching meteorology. He became full professor at Berlin University in 1936, and director of the Potsdam Geophysical Institute. From 1931 until the second year of World War II, he was also a research associate at the Carnegie Institution of Washington. He collaborated with Sydney Chapman to publish the two-volume work Geomagnetism, a definitive reference on geophysics.

In 1933, Bartels signed the Vow of allegiance of the Professors of the German Universities and High-Schools to Adolf Hitler and the National Socialistic State.

Following the war in 1946, he became professor in Göttingen. He was also a director at the Max Planck Institute for Physics of the Stratosphere (today Max Planck Institute for Solar System Research) between 1955 and 1964. When, in 1958 International Council for Science, created the Committee on Space Research (COSPAR), Bartels became chairman of the West-German branch. From 1954 until 1957, he served as first President of the IAGA. Between 1960 and 1963, he was vice-president of the International Union of Geodesy and Geophysics.

== Research ==
Among his contributions was the development of the Kp-index, and he suggested the existence of "M-regions" on the Sun that resulted in geomagnetic activity. These coronal holes were later confirmed by the Skylab mission. Finally he also helped initiate the International Geophysical Year, which took place in 1957/8.

The Bartels' Rotation Number of the Sun based on a regular 27-day cycle is named after him. It is similar to the Carrington rotation which is based on 27.2753 days.

== Awards and honors ==
- Posthumously awarded the William Bowie Medal of the American Geophysical Union.
- The Julius Bartels Medal, of the European Geosciences Union Division on Solar-Terrestrial Sciences, was named in his honor.
- The crater Bartels on the Moon is named after him.
- The Chree Medal and Prize in 1953

== See also ==
- List of geophysicists
