= Richard Hodgson (publisher) =

English publisher and astronomer (1804–1872)

Richard Hodgson (1804, in Wimpole Street, Marylebone, Central London – 4 May 1872, in Chingford, Essex) was an English publisher and astronomer.

Educated at Lewes, Hodgson worked for some years at a banking-house in Lombard Street. In 1834 he joined Boys & Graves to form Hodgson, Boys & Graves. In 1836 he formed with Henry Graves the publishing company Hodgson & Graves. In 1839 their company founded The Art Journal. In 1841 Hodgson retired from publishing to work on daguerreotype. In the late 1840s he created the Hawkwood estate. After a number of years of achieving considerable success in daguerreotypy, he worked on telescopic and microscopic observations.

According to his obituary in the Monthly Notices of the Royal Astronomical Society:

In 1852 he built an observatory at Claybury, in Essex, in which a 6-inch refractor was mounted equatorially. This was afterward moved to Hawkwood, and a transit-room added, which now contains the 4-inch instrument formerly in the possession of Dr. Lee of Hartwell. In 1854 he designed the diagonal eye-piece for observing the whole of the Sun's disc without contraction of the aperture of the object-glass, a description of which appeared in the Monthly Notices of that year. For many years he was a constant observer of the Sun, and made a series of drawings of many solar spots. Whilst so engaged, at 11.20 A.M. on the 1st of September 1859, he was fortunate in witnessing the remarkable outbreak in a large spot which was simultaneously observed by Mr. Carrington at Redhill.

The geomagnetic storm they observed is now known as the Carrington Event, which spurred the study of space weather. Hodgson was made in 1848 a Fellow of the Royal Astronomical Society and in 1849 a Fellow of the Royal Microscopical Society.

== See also ==
- Solar storm of 1859
