= Robert Dukinfield Darbishire =

British lawyer and antiquary (1826–1908)

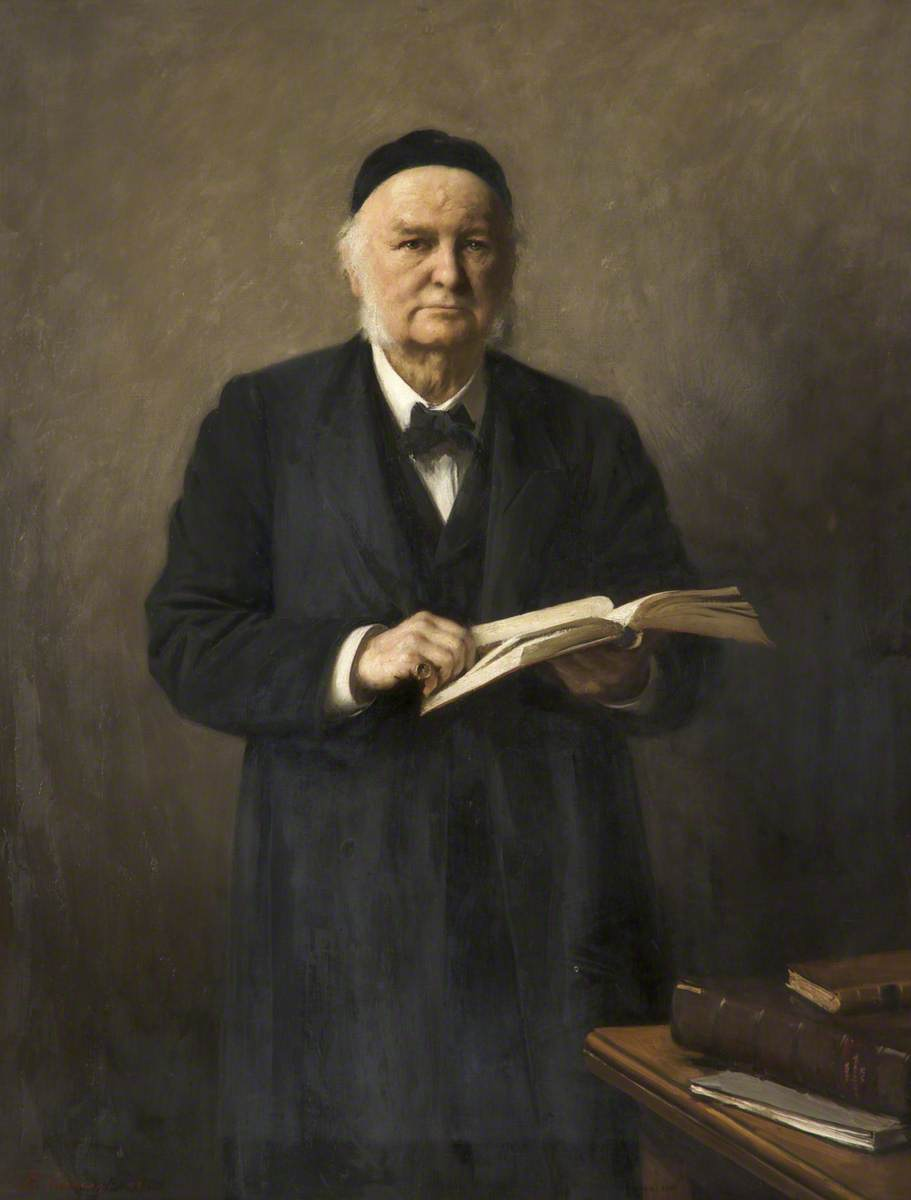
- portrait by Thomas Benjamin Kennington
- Born: 1826
- Died: 8 November 1908 (aged 81–82); Manchester
- Alma mater: University of London
- Occupation: Lawyer, conchologist

Robert Dukinfield Darbishire (1826–1908) was a prominent Manchester lawyer and philanthropist.

== Biography ==
Robert Dukinfield Darbishire's father, Samuel Dukinfield Darbishire (1799-1870), was a founder of Manchester Athenaeum and Manchester New College. Darbishire was a lay student for four years and worked for his father's law office. He graduated from the University of London in 1845.

He was elected to the membership of Manchester Literary and Philosophical Society on 19 April 1853 and to President in 1886

A prominent Unitarian layman, he worshipped at Cross Street Chapel. In 1857, he became the lay secretary of the Manchester College, and served for 37 years, including 22 years with his friend Charles Beard. He was a trustee of the Unitarian -inspired Hibbert Trust from 1874 to 1903.

Darbishire was instrumental in setting up the Whitworth Art Gallery and was a founding member of the Manchester High School for Girls.

== Philanthropy ==
Darbishire left money in his will to found the Darbishire House Health Centre, which paved the way for a number of organisations, including the Robert Darbishire Practice, the University of Manchester Department of General Practice and the Centre for Primary Care Research (later the National Primary Care Research and Development Centre).

Darbishire was one of the first major donors to the Manchester Museum, giving over 700 items to their collection from 1904 onwards. He was part of a Manchester network of acquirers who would buy many artifacts and then donate them to the city's institutions.

Darbishire was a particular advocate of women's right to education. He was an important figure in the refoundation or 'extension' of Owens College (forerunner of the University of Manchester), but resigned from its Council when he failed to persuade it to admit women in 1875. He was co-founder of its first women's hall, Ashburne Hall, in 1900.

== Art collection ==
- Wedgwood Manufactory's copy of the Portland Vase

Professional and academic associations
| Preceded by William Crawford Williamson | President of the Manchester Literary and Philosophical Society; 1886–87 | Succeeded by Balfour Stewart |
