= Differential rotation =

Variations in rotation rates

Differential rotation is seen when different parts of a rotating object move with different angular velocities (or rates of rotation) at different latitudes and/or depths of the body and/or in time. This indicates that the object is not rigid. In fluid objects, such as accretion disks, this leads to shearing. Galaxies and protostars usually show differential rotation; examples in the Solar System include the Sun, Jupiter and Saturn.

Around the year 1610, Galileo Galilei observed sunspots and calculated the rotation of the Sun. In 1630, Christoph Scheiner reported that the Sun had different rotational periods at the poles and at the equator, in good agreement with modern values.

== Cause ==
Stars and planets rotate in the first place because conservation of angular momentum turns random drifting of parts of the molecular cloud that they form from into rotating motion as they coalesce. Given this average rotation of the whole body, internal differential rotation is caused by convection in stars which is a movement of mass, due to steep temperature gradients from the core outwards. This mass carries a portion of the star's angular momentum, thus redistributing the angular velocity, possibly even far enough out for the star to lose angular velocity in stellar winds. Differential rotation thus depends on temperature differences in adjacent regions.

== Measurement ==
There are many ways to measure and calculate differential rotation in stars to see if different latitudes have different angular velocities. The most obvious is tracking spots on the stellar surface.

By doing helioseismological measurements of solar "p-modes" it is possible to deduce the differential rotation. The Sun has very many acoustic modes that oscillate in the interior simultaneously, and the inversion of their frequencies can yield the rotation of the solar interior. This varies with both depth and (especially) latitude.

The broadened shapes of absorption lines in the optical spectrum depend on v_{rot}sin(i), where i is the angle between the line of sight and the rotation axis, permitting the study of the rotational velocity's line-of-sight component v_{rot}. This is calculated from Fourier transforms of the line shapes, using equation (2) below for v_{rot} at the equator and poles. See also plot 2. Solar differential rotation is also seen in magnetograms, images showing the strength and location of solar magnetic fields.

It may be possible to measure the differential of stars that regularly emit flares of radio emission. Using 7 years of observations of the M9 ultracool dwarf TVLM 513–46546, astronomers were able to measure subtle changes in the arrival times of the radio waves. These measurements demonstrate that the radio waves can arrive 1–2 seconds sooner or later in a systematic fashion over a number of years. On the Sun, active regions are common sources of radio flares. The researchers concluded that this effect was best explained by active regions emerging and disappearing at different latitudes, such as occurs during the solar sunspot cycle.

== Effects ==
Gradients in angular rotation caused by angular momentum redistribution within the convective layers of a star are expected to be a main driver for generating the large-scale magnetic field, through magneto-hydrodynamical (dynamo) mechanisms in the outer envelopes. The interface between these two regions is where angular rotation gradients are strongest and thus where dynamo processes are expected to be most efficient.

The inner differential rotation is one part of the mixing processes in stars, mixing the materials and the heat/energy of the stars.

Differential rotation affects stellar optical absorption-line spectra through line broadening caused by lines being differently Doppler-shifted across the stellar surface.

Solar differential rotation causes shear at the so-called tachocline. This is a region where rotation changes from differential in the convection zone to nearly solid-body rotation in the interior, at 0.71 solar radii from the center.

== Surface level ==
For observed sunspots, the differential rotation can be calculated as:
$$\Omega = \Omega_{0}-\Delta\Omega \sin^{2}\Psi$$
where $\Omega_{0}$ is the rotation rate at the equator, and $\Delta\Omega = (\Omega_{0}-\Omega_\mathrm{pole})$ is the difference in angular velocity between pole and equator, called the strength of the rotational shear. $\Psi$ is the heliographic latitude, measured from the equator.

- The reciprocal of the rotational shear $\frac{2\pi}{\Delta\Omega}$ is the lap time, i.e. the time it takes for the equator to do a full lap more than the poles.
- The relative differential rotation rate is the ratio of the rotational shear to the rotation rate at the equator:
  $$\alpha=\frac{\Delta\Omega}{\Omega_{0}}$$
- The Doppler rotation rate in the Sun (measured from Doppler-shifted absorption lines), can be approximated as:
  $$\frac{\Omega}{2\pi} = (451.5-65.3\cos^{2}\theta - 66.7\cos^{4}\theta) \, \mathrm{nHz}$$
  where θ is the co-latitude (measured from the poles).

== Examples ==
=== Sun ===
Internal rotation in the Sun, showing differential rotation in the outer convective region and almost uniform rotation in the central radiative region.

On the Sun, the study of oscillations revealed that rotation is roughly constant within the whole radiative interior and variable with radius and latitude within the convective envelope. The Sun has an equatorial rotation speed of ~2 km/s; its differential rotation implies that the angular velocity decreases with increased latitude. The poles make one rotation every 34.3 days and the equator every 25.05 days, as measured relative to distant stars (sidereal rotation).

The highly turbulent nature of solar convection and anisotropies induced by rotation complicate the dynamics of modeling. Molecular dissipation scales on the Sun are at least six orders of magnitude smaller than the depth of the convective envelope. A direct numerical simulation of solar convection would have to resolve this entire range of scales in each of the three dimensions. Consequently, all solar differential rotation models must involve some approximations regarding momentum and heat transport by turbulent motions that are not explicitly computed. Thus, modeling approaches can be classified as either mean-field models or large-eddy simulations according to the approximations.

=== Disk galaxies ===
Disk galaxies do not rotate like solid bodies, but rather rotate differentially. The rotation speed as a function of radius is called a rotation curve, and is often interpreted as a measurement of the mass profile of a galaxy, as:
$$v_{c}(R)=\sqrt{\frac{GM(<R)}{R}}$$
where

- $v_{c}(R),$ is the rotation speed at radius $R$
- $M(<R),$ is the total mass enclosed within radius $R$

== See also ==
- Solar rotation
- Giovanni Cassini
- Solar nebula
- Stellar rotation
- Sunspot
