= Hawkwood, London =

25-acre estate in Chingford, London

Coordinates: 51°38′29″N 0°0′8″W

Hawkwood is a 25-acre estate in Chingford, in the London Borough of Waltham Forest, England. It takes its name from the adjacent woodland which is part of Epping Forest. It is about nine miles from central London, in the fertile Lea Valley.

In the 19th century it formed the grounds of a large Elizabethan-style Victorian mansion, seat of Richard Hodgson, lord of Chingford St. Pauls. The mansion became derelict after bomb damage in 1944 and was demolished in 1951. Part of the site is now a nature reserve, a special school has been built on another part, and a large part of the site is being used by OrganicLea, a workers' cooperative growing and selling food and providing horticultural training.

== History ==
Hawk Wood is an area of Epping Forest, lying on Chingford's ancient parish boundary with Waltham Abbey. The name deriving from "Chyngeforde(s)halke" (1323), later "Chyngford Hauke" (1501). Halke meaning corner, recess or hiding place in Middle English.

In 1498, William Jacson of Chingford Halke owned land around Hawkwood, and was a member of the Swainmote Court. Hawkwood was part of the Chingford St. Pauls Manor estate, so called because it had been held by the Dean and Chapter of St Paul's Cathedral for 500 years; in 1544, Henry VIII acquired the manors of Chingford Earls and Chingford St. Paul's with the intention of expanding the deer park he had created in Chingford between 1540 and 1543. However, Henry died in 1547 and the deer park was discontinued in 1553.

In 1832, Rev. T. Snell, lord of the manor of Chingford St. Pauls, lived in Hawkwood, but the location of his house is not known. He died in 1843 and the estate was bought by Richard Hodgson, together with the manorial rights, part of Chingford Plain, and some land at Chingford Green, for £2900. During the late 1840s, he established the Hawkwood estate, constructing a manor house to a design by Vulliamy, as well as the bailiff's cottage, stables, coach house and other outbuildings. The house was built in red brick with stone dressings and had a Gothic entrance hall, drawing room, dining room, library opening into a handsome conservatory, domestic offices, and billiard room. There were eight bedrooms and dressing rooms as well as day and night nurseries. In separate buildings there was a coach house and brick-built stables for four horses, as well as a cow house and piggeries. The elevated site afforded fine views over the valley and a long carriage drive led to the road. A ring of bricks in the ground near the site of the house indicates that the water supply was initially from a well. The bailiff's cottage, now known as Hawkwood Lodge, had a sitting room, kitchen, scullery, wash-house and four bedrooms as well as two acres of pasture. The cottage survives and now has Listed Building status; the London Borough of Waltham Forest converted it into a Field Study Centre in 1981. In 1848 Hodgson was elected a Fellow of the Royal Astronomical Society, and built an observatory in the grounds of Hawkwood, a short distance west of the house. Hodgson died in 1872 and the estate, described in probate records as "Effects under £30,000", passed to his widow Jane, who died in 1880.

Sidney Cooper (1841–1913), a retired tea merchant, bought the house, lodge and piggeries in 1886 for £6250. The Great Eastern Railway rail service between Chingford and central London had opened in 1873, and the current railway station, only about a mile from Hawkwood, had opened in 1878. In 1898, Cooper purchased part of a nearby farm, an area that later became a housing estate in the 1930s. Sidney Cooper died in 1913, leaving an estate valued over £125,783. Hawkwood remained in the family until it was sold at auction for £3500 in 1921 to Adolphus Herman Louis of Beaulieu. In 1924, when Cooper's widow Emily died, Hawkwood was sold to G. C. Nokes of Forest Road, Walthamstow for £3,600. George Nokes and his wife Constance were the last private owners of Hawkwood. George Nokes died in 1933, and in 1937 Mrs. Nokes transferred the outlying farms to the Conservators of Epping Forest and the main Hawkwood estate was sold to Chingford Urban District Council for £7250 with a covenant for it to be preserved as an open space and as a memorial to King George V.

== Chingford County High School ==
In 1938, Chingford County High School, a coeducational grammar school, was founded. The school used Hawkwood House as temporary premises for the first year. The first intake of 22 boys and 26 girls from the surrounding area started on 15 September, though the official opening was not until 2 November. The school magazine relates how even subjects such as chemistry were taught in the living room of the house.

Then in 1939 at the start of the second world war, the school was evacuated, first to Hockley in Essex, then to Coleford in the west of England where they were able to share a science laboratory with another school. The school returned in 1941 to new buildings in Nevin Drive, Chingford.

== Wartime damage and demolition ==
During World War II the house was damaged during a period when it was requisitioned by the Army. In 1943, Chingford Urban District Council arranged for the house to be connected to mains water and undertook some maintenance of the grounds. However, the house suffered considerable damage when a German V-1 flying bomb, coming from the north east, crashed into Hawkwood at 11:23 p.m. on 21 October 1944. There were no casualties as the house was unoccupied at the time. Property in nearby residential roads Hawkswood Crescent and Epping Glade was also damaged by the blast.

A request was made in 1945 by Chingford Townswomen's Guild and Women's Association that the house should be converted to a maternity hospital. But then in 1949, Hawkwood was sold to Essex County Council for use as a school, an intention that never came into effect. The house remained vandalised, unoccupied, derelict and unsafe until the Council arranged for its demolition by Ernest Knifton Ltd in 1951 for £375. The site remained undeveloped in accordance with Mrs. Nokes's covenant. Then in 1965 Chingford became part of the London Borough of Waltham Forest.

== Hawkswood School for the deaf ==
During the 1960s, an area in the northern part of the estate next to Yardley Lane was fenced off and a purpose-built special school for deaf children was constructed on the site. The William Morris School for the deaf, founded in Walthamstow in 1900, relocated in September 1969 to the new school, and the school went on to provide specialist education for deaf children from west Essex, Redbridge and Waltham Forest for over thirty years.

In September 2004 the school became Hawkswood Primary PRU (Pupil Referral Unit), catering for up to 44 children in the 4–11 age group. Their focus is for pupils in Key Stage 3 and Key Stage 4 at the delicate and fragile end of the mental health spectrum, including those with depression, psychosis, anorexia and self-harm. The Ofsted inspection 2015 rated the school as "Outstanding" in all respects.

== Hawkwood Pond and nature reserve ==
Near the western edge of the estate, an ornamental garden had been constructed around a pond in the grounds of the house. This subsequently became publicly accessible under the previous owner`s 1937 covenant, and remained so until 1979, when Waltham Forest Council fenced it off. Widespread objections ensued from many quarters: members of the Friends of Epping Forest, conservators, Waltham Forest Civic Society, the Drysdale & District Residents Association, Members of Parliament, and Lord Murray of Epping Forest. Eventually the 'Open Space' status of Hawkwood was confirmed, with reference to the `Open Space` covenant unearthed in the minutes of the 1937 council meeting by a local campaigner which were held in the Vestry House Museum, and public access was restored. Authorisation was given to those campaigners to create a voluntary organisation called "The Friends of Hawkwood Nature Reserve" as caretakers of the pond and surrounding area. The Reserve volunteers have since gone on to win the reserve The first National `Green Flag` award for the London Borough of Waltham Forest, and annually for the last consecutive eleven years

== Hawkwood Plant Nursery ==
Waltham Forest Council also used twelve acres of the estate in 1979 to set up Hawkwood Plant Nursery (its full title was Hawkwood Nursery for Plants and People), for the propagation and cultivation of plants for local authority planting around the borough. They constructed greenhouses covering a substantial area. Over twenty years later, in 2007, the council vacated the site for financial reasons.

== OrganicLea ==
OrganicLea Community Growers, a workers' co-operative, started in 2001, aiming to produce food locally using organic and permaculture principles. Organiclea Limited was incorporated as a Private Limited Company in 2004.

They started with an acre of derelict allotment land near Hawkwood, working with volunteers in exchange for a share of the harvest. This developed into a local food hub, selling organically grown produce from the allotment and from other small-scale organic farmers. The work expanded with a grant from the Big Lottery’s Making Local Food Work programme, enabling them to establish the Hornbeam Café plus a weekly box scheme and a Cropshare programme, with their mission statement being to "produce and distribute food and plants locally, and inspire and support others to do the same … bring people together to take action towards a more just and sustainable society."

After the closure of Hawkwood Plant Nursery in 2007, OrganicLea negotiated to use the site and facilities, and in 2010 they signed a ten-year lease to use the twelve acres, including the greenhouses. This has allowed significant expansion and has also increased the diversity of activities, which now include not only the production and selling of organic fruit and vegetables, but also training and education, support for community gardening, and working with local schools.

== See also ==
- Friday Hill House, historical manor house in the adjoining manor estate in Chingford
- Lea Valley, in which Hawkwood is located
- Pole Hill, within Epping Forest, just above Hawkwood, with fine views over London
