= Clifford Hawkwood =

English cricketer

Clifford Hawkwood (16 November 1909 – 15 May 1960) was an English cricketer active from 1928 to 1935 who played for Lancashire. He was born in Nelson and died in Burnley. He appeared in 24 first-class matches as a righthanded batsman, scoring 596 runs with a highest score of 113 and held nine catches.
