= Central meridian (astronomy) =

Coordinate line

Diagram with central meridian (note that the central meridian is not to be understood as going through the sphere as in an axis, but on the surface of the sphere, hence it is not drawn as a broken line

The central meridian of a celestial body that presents a disc to an observer (such as planet, moon, or star) is the meridian on the body's surface that goes through the centre of the body's disc as seen from the point of view of the observer.

The term as generally used in observational astronomy refers to the central meridian of the celestial body as seen by a theoretical observer on Earth for whom the celestial body is at the zenith. An imaginary line is drawn from the centre of the Earth to the center of the other celestial body. The intersection between this line and the celestial body's surface is the sub-Earth point. The central meridian is the meridian going through the sub-Earth point.

Because of the body's rotation and orbital alignment with the observer the central meridian changes with time, as it is based on the observer's point of view. For example, consider the Earth as seen from the Moon. There will be a meridian going through the centre of the Earth's visible disc (for example 75° West). This is not always the Earth's prime meridian (0° W / 0° E), as the central meridian of the Earth as seen from the Moon changes as the Earth rotates.
