= Rotunda Museum =

Museum in Scarborough, North Yorkshire, England

- The Rotunda Museum in North Yorkshire
- Established: 1829
- Location: The Rotunda Museum, Vernon Road, Scarborough, North Yorkshire YO11 2NN Telephone : 01723 353665
- Coordinates: 54.279°N 0.398°W
- Type: Geological
- Visitors: Open Tue–Sun, 10 am–5 pm
- Website: https://www.scarboroughmuseumstrust.com/rotunda-museum/

The Rotunda Museum is one of the oldest purpose-built museums still in use in the United Kingdom. The curved grade II* listed building was constructed in 1829 as one of the country's first purpose-built museums. Situated in the English coastal resort of Scarborough, North Yorkshire, it houses one of the foremost collections of Jurassic geology on the Yorkshire Coast.

== Founding ==
The Rotunda Museum, described as the finest surviving purpose-built museum of its age in the country, was built in 1829 by Richard Hey Sharp of York, to a design suggested by William Smith, the "Father of English Geology". Smith's pioneering work established that geological strata could be identified and correlated using the fossils they contain. Smith came to Scarborough after his release from debtors' prison. The dramatic Jurassic coastline of Yorkshire offered him an area of geological richness.

Sir John Johnstone became Smith's patron and employed him as his land steward at Hackness. Johnstone was president of the Scarborough Philosophical Society, which raised the money to build the Rotunda and consulted Smith as to the museum's design. Still in his twenties, Sir John was an intellectual leader in Scarborough in the 1820s and a staunch supporter of Smith and his ideas. He donated the Hackness stone of which the Rotunda Museum is built. Smith had seen a rotunda in London and instructed the architect, Richard Sharp of York, to follow that design. The Rotunda Museum was built to Smith's design suggestion and the original display of fossils illustrated his ideas. The fossils and rocks were arranged in the order in which they occurred, with the youngest in the cases at the top and the oldest at the bottom. The order around the walls reflected the order of rocks on the Yorkshire coast. A section of the rocks on the coast was drawn around the inside of the dome of the building by Smith's nephew, another geologist, John Phillips. The two wings were added to the building in 1860.

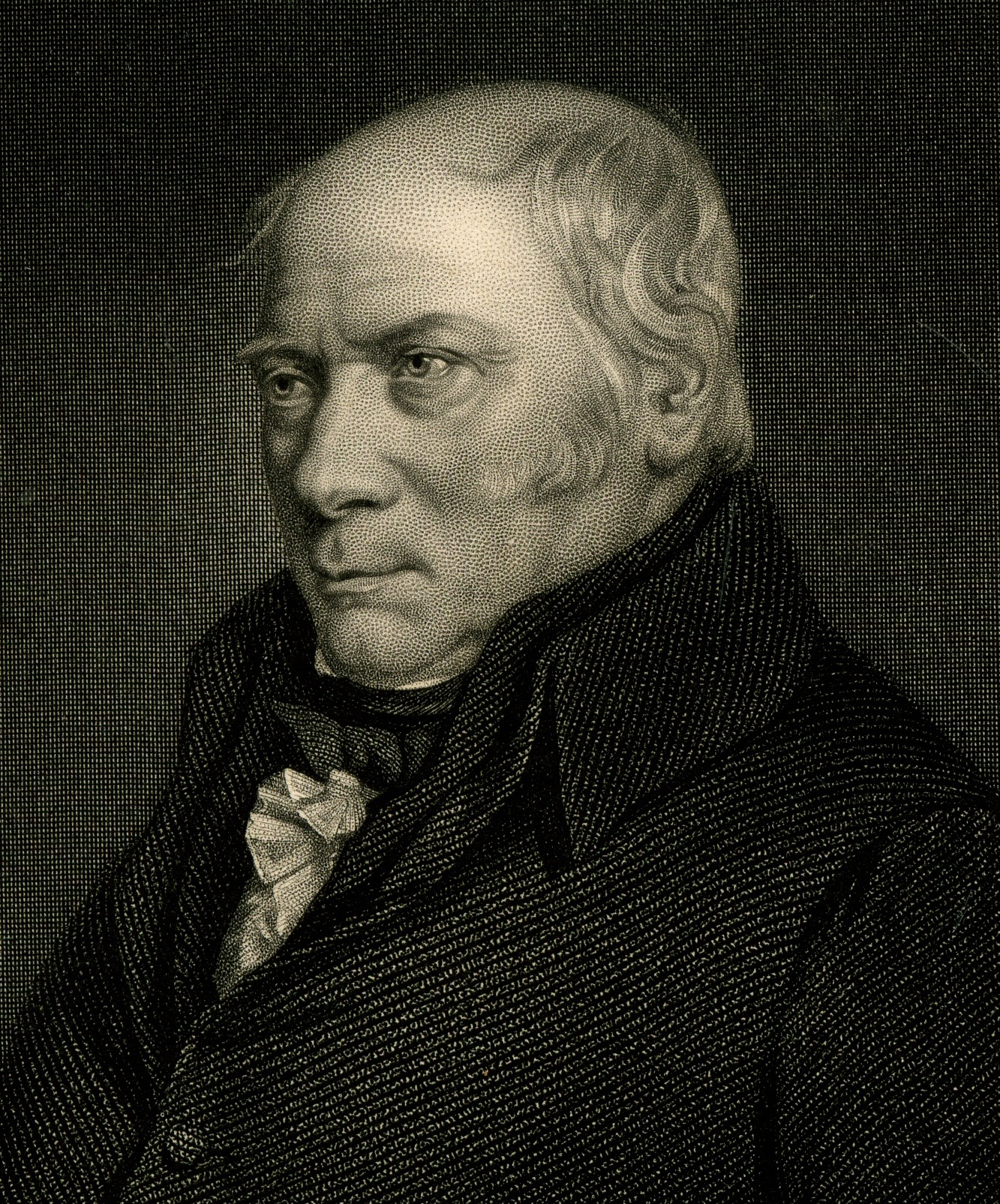
William Smith

== Collection ==
The collection contains over 5,500 fossils and 3,000 minerals, with numerous type specimens (the first of their kind to be described), and a notable number of Middle Jurassic fossil plants. It also includes a large selection of Cretaceous fossils from the Speeton Clay and the Chalk, a variety of Upper and Lower Jurassic specimens, specimens from the Last Glacial Period, such as mammoth teeth and fossils from the Kirkdale Cave and a Carboniferous plant collection. The collection was catalogued and conserved in 2007 and the more notable specimens are now on display.

== Refurbishment ==
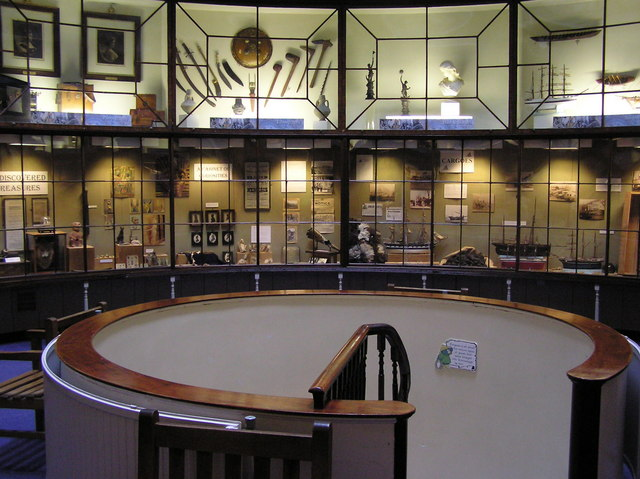
The Rotunda Museum before refurbishment

Scarborough Borough Council's plans to return the institution to its original role as a geological showcase were supported by a £1.8 million grant from the Heritage Lottery Fund (HLF), as well as funds from the European Regional Development Fund and over £1.5 million raised from private and corporate sources. Supported by English Heritage, the project was designed to make the museum a gateway to the area's Dinosaur Coast and included creating a new entrance and installing a lift to improve disabled access. It was also intended to act as a tribute to the Rotunda's designer, William Smith.

William Anelay Limited was contracted to carry out essential external stonemasonry repairs and to cover the existing dome roof with a new lead covering. The contract included the demolition of some internal walls and the building of an extension to the front of the property. This provided a new entrance area, offices and toilet facilities and allows access from the path to the building at basement level. The existing spiral staircase was removed and stored, and a new one installed allowing for a lift shaft in the centre. The museum was closed during the restoration and refurbishment period and reopened in May 2008.

A set of unique glass display cabinets has been put back in the museum after undergoing restoration. The cabinets date back to 1850 and were designed to showcase the work of Smith. They were removed from the upper gallery and have now been cleaned, restored and repaired where necessary. Tim Phelps and his team of specialists based near Knaresborough carried out the work. The cabinets now display items such as a model of George Cayley's original flying machine and an early steam car model by Sir Edward Harland. Lower tiers house artifacts such as fossils, rock samples and minerals.

Shell is the biggest corporate donor and is the title sponsor of the Shell Geology Now! gallery. This area of the museum looks at current geological and environmental research "bringing it to life for visitors to this unique museum". It reopened on Friday 9 May 2008 following a two-year refurbishment costing £4.4 million. The museum was renamed The Rotunda – The William Smith Museum of Geology.

From 2005 to 2025 the museum was run by Scarborough Museums Creative and Cultural Trust after which it was returned to North Yorkshire Council.

== See also ==
- Grade II* listed buildings in North Yorkshire (district)
- Listed buildings in Scarborough (Castle Ward)
