= Carrington Event =

Geomagnetic storm in 1859

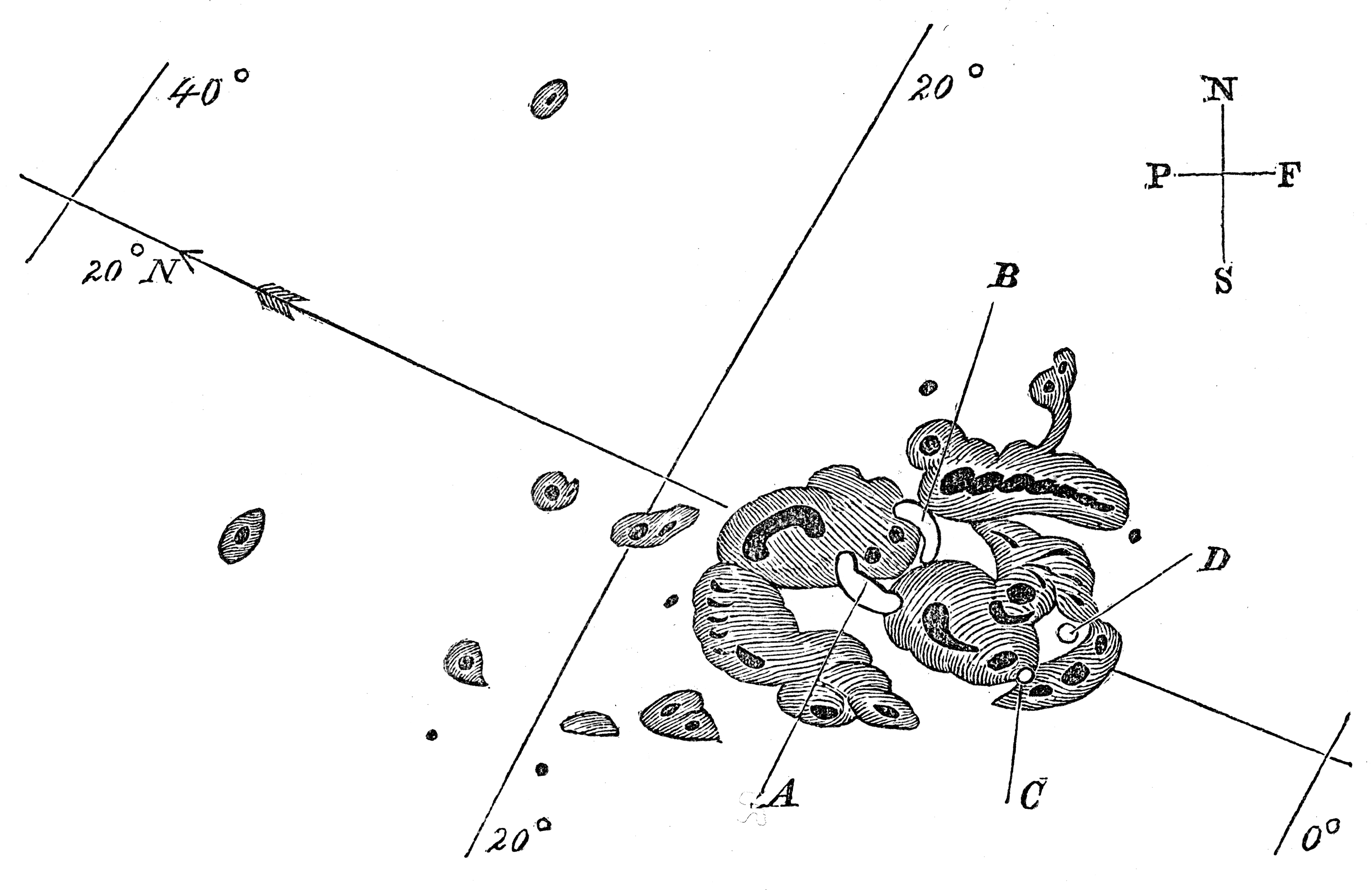
- Sunspots of 1 September 1859, as sketched by Richard Carrington. A and B mark the initial positions of an intensely bright event, which moved over the course of five minutes to C and D before disappearing.

Coronal mass ejection
- Travel time: 17.6 hr (est.)

Geomagnetic storm
- Initial onset: 1 September 1859
- Dissipated: 2 September 1859
- Lowest Dst: −0.80 to −1.75 μT (estimate)
- Impacts: Severe damage to telegraph stations

The Carrington Event was the most intense geomagnetic storm in recorded history, peaking on 1–2 September 1859 during solar cycle 10. It created strong auroral displays that were reported globally and caused sparking and even fires in telegraph stations. The geomagnetic storm was most likely the result of a coronal mass ejection (CME) from the Sun colliding with Earth's magnetosphere.

The geomagnetic storm was associated with a very bright solar flare on 1 September 1859. It was observed and recorded independently by British astronomers Richard Carrington and Richard Hodgson—the first records of a solar flare. A geomagnetic storm of this magnitude occurring today has the potential to cause widespread electrical disruptions and blackouts as well as damage to the electrical power grid and satellites.

== History ==
=== Geomagnetic storm ===
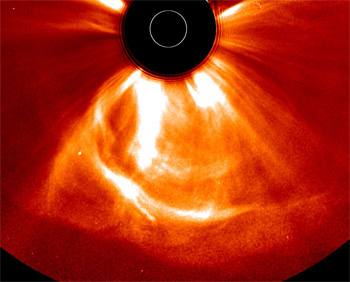
Image of the July 2012 solar storm, which generated CMEs of comparable strength to the one of 1859. The small bright circle in the light baffle demonstrates the size of the Sun.

On 1 and 2 September 1859, one of the largest geomagnetic storms (as recorded by ground-based magnetometers) occurred. Estimates of the storm strength (Dst) range from −0.80 to −1.75 μT.

The geomagnetic storm is thought to have been caused by a coronal mass ejection (CME) that traveled directly toward Earth, taking 17.6 hours to make the 150×10^{6} km (93×10^{6} mi) journey. Typical CMEs take several days to arrive at Earth, but it is believed that the relatively high speed of this CME was made possible by a prior CME, perhaps the cause of the large aurora event on 29 August that "cleared the way" of ambient solar wind plasma for the Carrington Event.

=== Associated solar flare ===
Just before noon on 1 September 1859, the English astronomers Richard Carrington and Richard Hodgson independently recorded the earliest observations of a solar flare. Carrington and Hodgson compiled independent reports which were published side by side in Monthly Notices of the Royal Astronomical Society and exhibited their drawings of the event at the November 1859 meeting of the Royal Astronomical Society.

Because of a geomagnetic solar flare effect (a "magnetic crochet") observed in the Kew Observatory magnetometer record by Scottish physicist Balfour Stewart and a geomagnetic storm observed the following day, Carrington suspected a solar–terrestrial connection. However, he was not sure whether the two phenomena were related, writing that "one swallow does not make a summer". Worldwide reports of the effects of the geomagnetic storm of 1859 were compiled and published by American mathematician Elias Loomis, which support the observations of Carrington and Stewart.

== Impact ==
=== Auroras ===
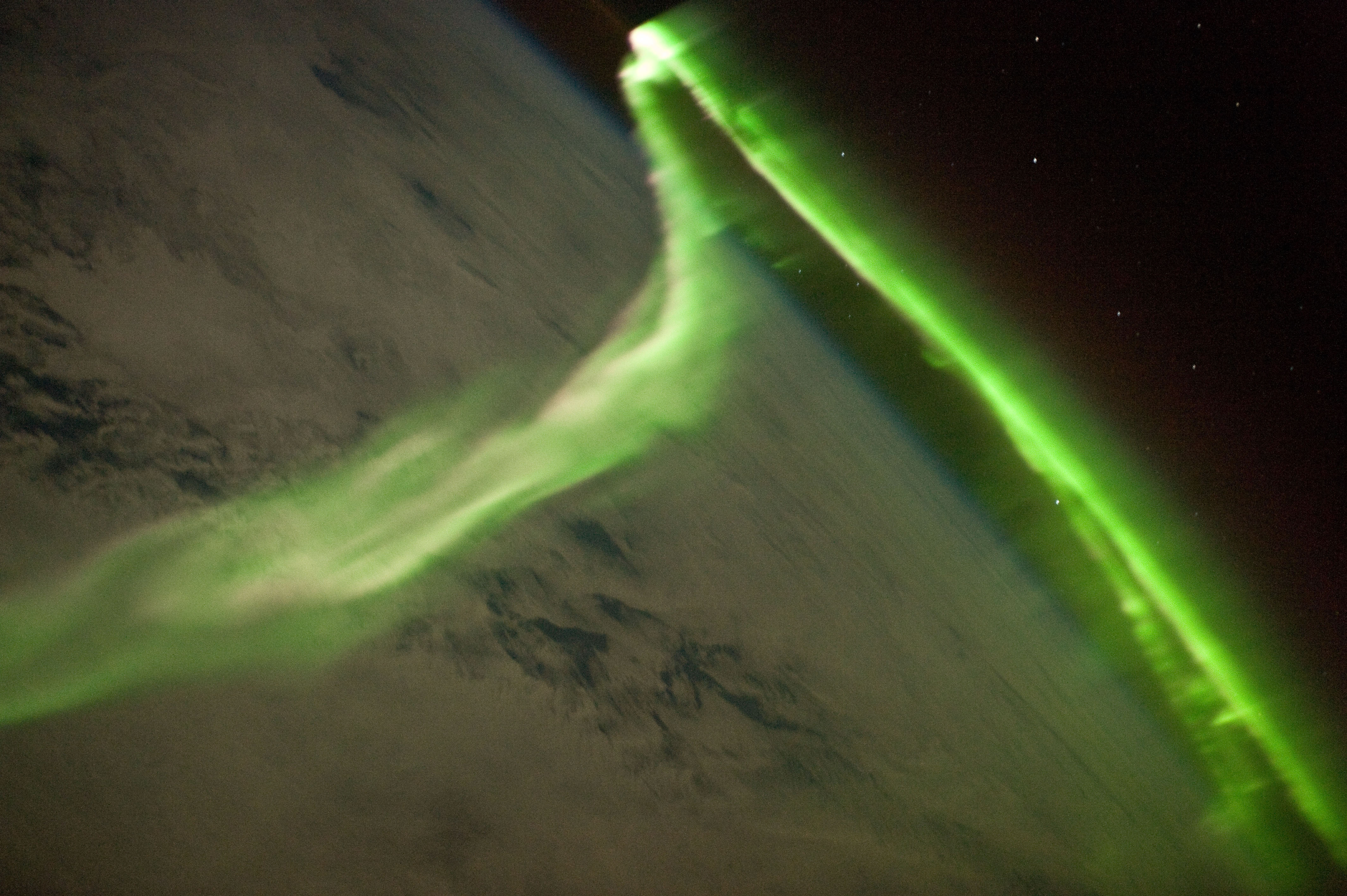
Aurora during a geomagnetic storm that was most likely caused by a coronal mass ejection from the Sun on 24 May 2010, taken from the International Space Station

Auroras were seen around the world in the northern and southern hemispheres. The aurora borealis over the Rocky Mountains in the United States was so bright that the glow awakened gold miners, who were reported to have begun to prepare breakfast because they thought it was morning. It was also reported that people in the north-eastern United States could read a newspaper by the aurora's light. The aurora was also visible from the poles to low latitude areas such as south-central Mexico, Cuba, Hawaii, Queensland, southern Japan and China, New Zealand, and even at lower latitudes very close to the equator, such as Colombia.

On Saturday 3 September 1859, the Baltimore American and Commercial Advertiser reported that

Those who happened to be out late on Thursday night had an opportunity of witnessing another magnificent display of the auroral lights. The phenomenon was very similar to the display on Sunday night, though at times the light was, if possible, more brilliant, and the prismatic hues more varied and gorgeous. The light appeared to cover the whole firmament, apparently like a luminous cloud, through which the stars of the larger magnitude indistinctly shone. The light was greater than that of the moon at its full, but had an indescribable softness and delicacy that seemed to envelop everything upon which it rested. Between 12 and 1 o'clock, when the display was at its full brilliancy, the quiet streets of the city resting under this strange light, presented a beautiful as well as singular appearance.

In 1909, an Australian gold miner named C. F. Herbert retold his observations in a letter to the Daily News in Perth,

I was gold-digging at Rokewood, about four miles [6 km] from Rokewood township (Victoria). Myself and two mates looking out of the tent saw a great reflection in the southern heavens at about 7 o'clock p.m., and in about half an hour, a scene of almost unspeakable beauty presented itself: Lights of every imaginable color were issuing from the southern heavens, one color fading away only to give place to another if possible more beautiful than the last, the streams mounting to the zenith, but always becoming a rich purple when reaching there, and always curling round, leaving a clear strip of sky, which may be described as four fingers held at arm's length. The northern side from the zenith was also illuminated with beautiful colors, always curling round at the zenith, but were considered to be merely a reproduction of the southern display, as all colors south and north always corresponded. It was a sight never to be forgotten, and was considered at the time to be the greatest aurora recorded [...]. The rationalist and pantheist saw nature in her most exquisite robes, recognising, the divine immanence, immutable law, cause, and effect. The superstitious and the fanatical had dire forebodings, and thought it a foreshadowing of Armageddon and final dissolution.

=== Telegraphs ===
Because of the geomagnetically induced current from the electromagnetic field, telegraph systems all over Europe and North America failed, in some cases giving their operators electric shocks. Telegraph pylons threw sparks. Some operators were able to continue to send and receive messages despite having disconnected their power supplies. The following conversation occurred between two operators of the American telegraph line between Boston, Massachusetts, and Portland, Maine, on the night of 2 September 1859 (as reported in the Boston Evening Traveler):

Boston operator (to Portland operator): "Please cut off your battery [power source] entirely for fifteen minutes."

Portland operator: "Will do so. It is now disconnected."

Boston: "Mine is disconnected, and we are working with the auroral current. How do you receive my writing?"

Portland: "Better than with our batteries on. – Current comes and goes gradually."

Boston: "My current is very strong at times, and we can work better without the batteries, as the aurora seems to neutralize and augment our batteries alternately, making current too strong at times for our relay magnets. Suppose we work without batteries while we are affected by this trouble."

Portland: "Very well. Shall I go ahead with business?"

Boston: "Yes. Go ahead."

The conversation was carried on for around two hours using no battery power and working solely with the current induced by the aurora, the first time on record that more than a word or two was transmitted in such manner.

== Similar events ==
Another strong solar storm occurred in February 1872. Less severe storms also occurred in 1921 (this was comparable by some measures), 1938, 1941, 1958, 1959 and 1960, when widespread radio disruption was reported. The flares and CMEs of the August 1972 solar storms were similar to the Carrington event in size and magnitude; however, unlike the 1859 storms, they did not cause an extreme geomagnetic storm. The March 1989 geomagnetic storm knocked out power across large sections of Quebec, while the 2003 Halloween solar storms registered the most powerful solar explosions ever recorded. On 23 July 2012, a "Carrington-class" solar superstorm (solar flare, CME, solar electromagnetic pulse) was observed, but its trajectory narrowly missed Earth by a margin of roughly nine days. During the May 2024 solar storms, an aurora borealis was sighted as far south as Puerto Rico.

In June 2013, a joint venture from researchers at Lloyd's of London and Atmospheric and Environmental Research (AER) in the US used data from the Carrington Event to estimate the cost of a similar event in the present to the US alone at US$600 billion to $2.6 trillion (equivalent to $794 billion to $3.44 trillion in 2024), which, at the time, equated to roughly 3.6 to 15.5 percent of annual GDP. In addition to this effect on the general economy, there is also research that highlights the potential consequences of a large geomagnetic storm on agriculture. The effect here is indirect, meaning via the loss of access to agricultural inputs like fertilizer or pesticides, due to a disrupted industrial production. This has been estimated to potentially reduce yields by 38–48% globally, with yield losses of up to 75% in some areas like Central Europe.

Other research has looked for signatures of large solar flares and CMEs in carbon-14 in tree rings and beryllium-10 (among other isotopes) in ice cores. The signature of a large solar storm has been found for the years 774–775 and 993–994. Carbon-14 levels stored in 775 suggest an event about 20 times the normal variation of the Sun's activity, and 10 or more times the size of the Carrington Event. An event in 7176 BCE may have exceeded even the 774–775 CE event based on this proxy data.

Whether the physics of solar flares is similar to that of even larger superflares is still unclear. The Sun may differ in important ways such as size and speed of rotation from the types of stars that are known to produce superflares.

== Other evidence ==
Ice cores containing thin nitrate-rich layers have been analysed to reconstruct a history of past solar storms predating reliable observations. This was based on the hypothesis that solar energetic particles would ionize nitrogen, leading to the production of nitric oxide and other oxidised nitrogen compounds, which would not be too diluted in the atmosphere before being deposited along with snow.

Beginning in 1986, some researchers claimed that data from Greenland ice cores showed evidence of individual solar particle events, including the Carrington Event. More recent ice core work, however, casts significant doubt on this interpretation and shows that nitrate spikes are likely not a result of solar energetic particle events but can be due to terrestrial events such as forest fires, and correlate with other chemical signatures of known forest fire plumes. Nitrate events in cores from Greenland and Antarctica do not align, so the hypothesis that they reflect proton events is now in significant doubt.

A 2024 study analysed digitized magnetogram readings from magnetic observatories at Kew and Greenwich. "Initial analysis suggests the rates of change of the field of over 700 nT/min exceeded the 1-in-100 years extreme value of 350–400 nT/min at this latitude based on digital-era records", indicating a far greater change rate than modern digital measurements.

== See also ==
- A-index
- K-index
- Miyake event
- Nuclear electromagnetic pulse
- F region
- Geomagnetic storm
