= Fusa Miyake =

Japanese physicist

- Education: Nagoya University
- Known for: Miyake event
- Scientific career
- Fields: cosmic ray physics; isotope abundance and dating
- Thesis: Reconstruction of cosmic-ray intensity in the past from measurements of radiocarbon in tree rings (2013)

Fusa Miyake (born 1987) is a cosmic ray physicist at Nagoya University, Japan, whose work measuring isotope abundances led to recognition of so-called Miyake events. These have resulted in reconciling differences between dates from documents and materials such as ice-cores and tree rings.

== Scientific career ==
Fusa Miyake gained her doctorate from Nagoya University in 2013 and was then appointed as an assistant professor. In 2017 she was promoted to associate professor in the Division for Cosmic Ray Research within the Space-Earth Environmental Research Division.

Her doctoral research identified events in the wood of long-lived Japanese cedar trees, now called Miyake events, where there are sudden increases in cosmogenic isotopes such as radioactive carbon isotope ^{14}C, ^{10}Be and ^{36}Cl produced by cosmic rays originating from the Sun when large solar flares or eruptions occur. These isotopes can be detected in materials such as tree-rings and ice cores. Although the event was initially proposed to be a signature of an unidentified supernova, it was soon proven to be the discovery of an extreme solar particle event and confirmed independently. As an example, measurements can utilised the carbon in the polymer cellulose extracted from tree-rings formed in individual years to measure abundance of the isotope ^{14}C using accelerator mass spectrometry. Measuring these isotopes in materials that have been independently dated allow the events to be dated with precision. This gives information about the Sun's long-term activity. She identified an event in 775 during her doctoral work, and along with colleagues, has subsequently identified events centred on 993-4 and also 660 and 5480 BCE. By 2023, 6 Miyake events had been identified.

Her subsequent research with worldwide collaborators, and that of other researchers, has suggested that the source of the radiation causing Miyake events is more complicated than from single solar events. Some may be from multiple solar flares, influenced by tree physiology or by interactions of high energy particles with the Earth's magnetic field.

== Publications ==
Miyake is the author or coauthor of over 50 scientific publications and books. These include:

- Ilya G. Usoskin, Fusa Miyake, Mélanie Baroni and 17 others (2023) Extreme Solar Events: Setting up a Paradigm. Space Science Reviews 219 pp73
- P.J. Reimer, W.E.N, E. Bard ... F. Miyake ... and 38 others (2020) The IntCal20 Northern Hemisphere Radiocarbon Age Calibration Curve (0–55 cal kBP). Radiocarbon 62 pp 725–757
- A. Scifo, M. Kuitems, A. Neocleous ... F. Miyake and 6 others (2019) Radiocarbon Production Events and their Potential Relationship with the Schwabe Cycle. Scientific Reports 9 17056
- Fusa Miyake, Ilya Usoskin and Stepan Poluianov (2019) Extreme Solar Particle Storms: The hostile Sun Institute of Physics Publishing, pp 447. ISBN 9780750322300
- Fusa Miyake, A.J. Timothy Jull, Irina P. Panyushkina and 7 others (2017) Large 14C excursion in 5480 BC indicates an abnormal sun in the mid-Holocene. Proceedings of the National Academy of Sciences (U.S.A.) 114 pp 881–884
- F. Miyake, K. Nagaya, K. Masuda and T. Nakamura (2012) A signature of cosmic-ray increase in AD 774–775 from tree rings in Japan. Nature 486 pp 240 –242

== Awards ==
In 2017 Miyake received a Commendation Award for Young Scientists from the Japanese Minister of Education, Culture, Sports, Science and Technology. In 2022 she received the José A. Boninsegna Frontiers in Dendrochronology Award from the Tree-Ring Society.
