= Miyake event =

Sharp increase in cosmogenic isotopes

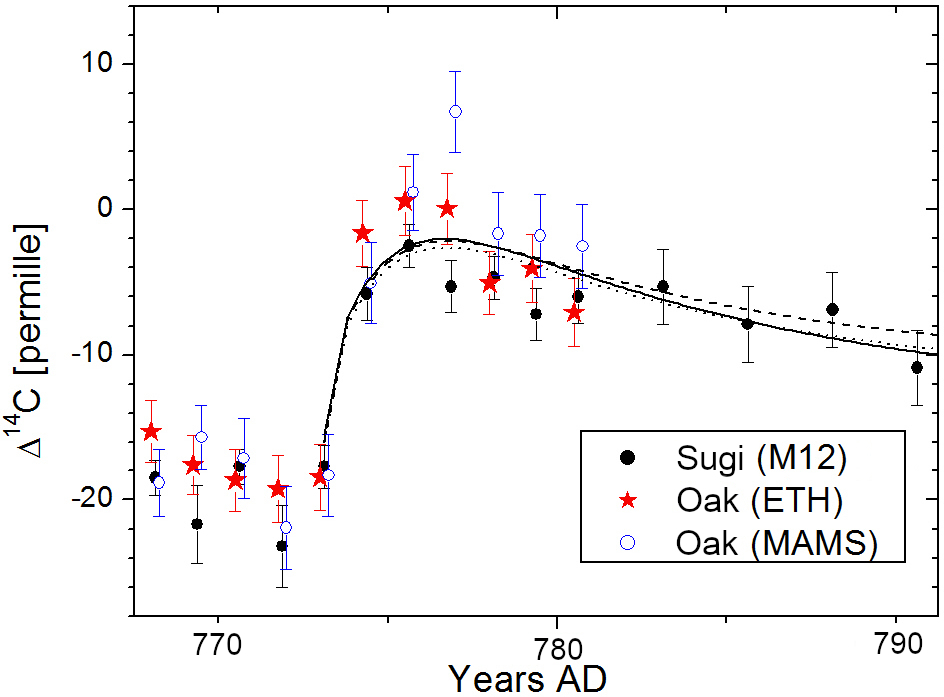
Time profiles of ^{14}C concentration measured in the annual rings of Japanese cedar (Sugi) and German oak show a spike during the Miyake event in 774 CE

A Miyake event is an observed sharp enhancement of the production of cosmogenic isotopes by cosmic rays. It can be marked by a spike in the concentration of radioactive carbon isotope ^{14}C in tree rings, as well as ^{10}Be and ^{36}Cl in ice cores, which are all independently dated. At present, five significant events are known (7176 BCE, 5259 BCE, 664–663 BCE, 774 CE, and 993 CE) for which the spike in ^{14}C is quite remarkable, i.e. above 1% rise over a period of two years, and four more events (12,350 BCE, 5410 BCE, 1052 CE, 1279 CE) need independent confirmation. It is not known how often Miyake events occur, but from the available data it is estimated to be every 400 to 2,400 years. A Miyake event occurring in modern conditions would cause severe damage to global technological infrastructure such as satellites, telecommunications, and power grids.

There is strong evidence that Miyake events are caused by extreme solar particle events and they are likely related to super-flares discovered on solar-like stars. Although Miyake events are based on extreme year-to-year rises of ^{14}C concentration, the duration of the periods over which the ^{14}C levels increase or stay at high levels is longer than one year. However, a universal cause and origin of all the events is not yet established, and some of the events may be caused by other phenomena coming from beyond the Solar System, such as a gamma-ray burst.

A 2023 study dated the largest known Miyake event between 12,350 and 12,349 BCE, identified by an international team who measured radiocarbon levels in ancient trees recovered from the eroded banks of the Drouzet River, near Gap in the Southern French Alps. Although the ^{14}C increase was nearly double that for the next strongest spike in 774 CE, the strength of the corresponding solar event was only 18% higher, because of the combined effect of the lower atmospheric CO_{2} level and weaker geomagnetic field However, this event has not yet been independently confirmed in wood from other regions, nor is it reliably supported by a clear corresponding spike in other isotopes, such as beryllium-10, that are needed to reconstruct the spectrum of solar energetic particles.

== Discovery ==
The events are named after the Japanese physicist Fusa Miyake who, as a doctoral student, was the first to identify these radiocarbon spikes and published the results with co-authors in 2012 in the journal Nature. The investigation at that time found a strong ^{14}C increase in the annual rings of Japanese cedars for the years 774/775. The event of 775 was independently discovered, using the low-resolution IntCal data.

In 2013, Miyake and co-authors published the discovery of another similar radiocarbon spike in the years 993/994. In December 2013, Miyake received her Doctor of Science degree from Nagoya University.

== Time benchmark ==
After a Miyake event is well-studied and confirmed, it can serve as a reference time benchmark, a "year-stamp", enabling more precise dating of historical buildings, objects, and events. Six diverse historical occurrences, from archaeological sites to natural disasters, have thus been dated to a specific year, using Miyake events as benchmarks and counting subsequent annual tree rings. For example, the Miyake event of 993 has been identified in woodwork from the Viking archaeological site at L'Anse aux Meadows, in Newfoundland, and counting later tree rings has shown that the wood is from a tree felled in 1021, and thus that Europeans reached the Americas by that date. Another study performed on the tree-rings of wooden building remains from the Neolithic waterlogged site of Dispilio in north-western Greece, identified the Miyake event of 5259 BC, thus for a first time absolutely dating a Neolithic site in Europe from the 6th millennium BC to a single calendar year.

== See also ==
- Carrington Event
- Coronal mass ejection
- Dendrochronology
- Geomagnetic storm
- Solar storm
