= August 1972 solar storms =

Solar storms during solar cycle 20

Solar storms of August 1972
Geomagnetic storm
- Initial onset: 2 August 1972
- Dissipated: 11 August 1972
- Impacts: Satellite wear and imaging errors; detonation of magnetic-influence sea mines near Haiphong, North Vietnam; localized electric grid and telephone line interruptions

The solar storms of August 1972 were a historically powerful series of solar storms with intense to extreme solar flare, solar particle event, and geomagnetic storm components in early August 1972, during solar cycle 20. The storm caused widespread electric- and communication-grid disturbances through large portions of North America as well as satellite disruptions. On 4 August 1972 the storm caused the accidental detonation of numerous U.S. naval mines near Haiphong, North Vietnam. The coronal mass ejection (CME)'s transit time from the Sun to the Earth is the fastest ever recorded.

== Solar-terrestrial characteristics ==
=== Sunspot region ===
The most significant detected solar flare activity occurred from 2 to 11 August. Most of the significant solar activity emanated from active sunspot region McMath 11976 (MR 11976; active regions being clusters of sunspot pairs). McMath 11976 was extraordinarily magnetically complex. Its size was large although not exceptionally so. McMath 11976 produced 67 solar flares (4 of these X-class) during the time it was facing Earth, from 29 July to 11 August. It also produced multiple relatively rare white light flares over multiple days. The same active area was long-lived. It persisted through five solar rotation cycles, first receiving the designation as Region 11947 as it faced Earth, going unseen as it rotated past the far side of the Sun, then returning Earthside as Region 11976, before cycling as Regions 12007, 12045, and 12088, respectively.

=== Flare of 4 August ===
==== Electromagnetic effects ====
The 4 August flare was among the largest since records began. It saturated the Solrad 9 X-ray sensor at approximately X5.3 but was estimated to be in the vicinity of X20, the threshold of the very rarely reached R5 on the NOAA radio blackout space weather scale. A radio burst of 76,000 sfu was measured at 1 GHz. This was an exceptionally long duration flare, generating X-ray emissions above background level for more than 16 hours. Rare emissions in the gamma ray ($\gamma$-ray) spectrum were detected for the first time, on both 4 and 7 August, by the Orbiting Solar Observatory (OSO 7). The broad spectrum electromagnetic emissions of the largest flare are estimated to total 1-5 × 10^{32} ergs in energy released.

==== CMEs ====
The arrival time of the associated coronal mass ejection (CME) and its coronal cloud, 14.6 hours, remains the record shortest duration as of November 2023, indicating an exceptionally fast and typically an exceptionally geoeffective event (normal transit time is two to three days). A preceding series of solar flares and CMEs cleared the interplanetary medium of particles, enabling the rapid arrival in a process similar to the July 2012 solar storm. Normalizing the transit times of other known extreme events to a standard 1 AU to account for the varying distance of the Earth from the Sun throughout the year, one study found the ultrafast 4 August flare to be an outlier to all other events, even compared to the great solar storm of 1859, the overall most extreme known solar storm, which is known as the "Carrington Event". This corresponds to an ejecta speed of an estimated 2,850 km/s (1,770 mi/s).

The near Earth vicinity solar wind velocity may also be record-breaking and is calculated to have exceeded 2,000 km/s (1,200 mi/s) (about 0.7% of light speed). The velocity was not directly measurable as instrumentation was off-scale high. Analysis of a Guam magnetogram indicated a shockwave traversing the magnetosphere at 3,080 km/s (1,910 mi/s) and astonishing sudden storm commencement (SSC) time of 62 s. Estimated magnetic field strength of 73-103 nT and electric field strength of >200 mV/m was calculated at 1 AU.

==== Solar particle event ====
Reanalysis based on IMP-5 (a.k.a. Explorer 41) space solar observatory data suggests that >10-MeV ion flux reached 70,000 particles·s^{-1}·sr^{-1}·cm^{-2} (i.e. 70,000 particles per second, per steradian, per square centimeter; see Radiance) bringing it near the exceedingly rarely reached NOAA S5 level on the solar radiation scale. Fluxes at other energy levels, from soft to hard, at >1 MeV, >30 MeV, and >60 MeV, also reached extreme levels, as well as inferred for >100 MeV. The particle storm led to northern hemisphere polar stratospheric ozone depletion of about 46% at 50 km (31 mi) altitude for several days before the atmosphere recovered and which persisted for 53 days at the lower altitude of 39 km (24 mi).

The intense solar wind and particle storm associated with the CMEs led to one of the largest decreases in cosmic ray radiation from outside the Solar System, known as a Forbush decrease, ever observed. Solar energetic particle (SEP) onslaught was so strong that the Forbush decrease in fact partially abated. SEPs reached the Earth's surface, causing a ground level event (GLE).

==== Geomagnetic storm ====
The 4 August flare and ejecta caused significant to extreme effects on the Earth's magnetosphere, which responded in an unusually complex manner. The minimum disturbance storm time index (Dst) was only −154 nT, falling merely within the relatively common "intense" storm category. Initially an exceptional geomagnetic response occurred and some extreme storming occurred locally later (some of these possibly within substorms), but arrival of subsequent CMEs with northward oriented magnetic fields is thought to have shifted the interplanetary magnetic field (IMF) from an initial southward to northward orientation, thus substantially suppressing geomagnetic activity as the solar blast was largely deflected away from rather than toward Earth. An early study found an extraordinary asymmetry range of ≈450 nT. A 2006 study found that if a favorable IMF southward orientation were present that the Dst may have surpassed −1,600 nT, comparable to the 1859 Carrington Event, and a 2024 study found that such a storm could have produced a 774–775-scale solar particle event.

Magnetometers in Boulder, Colorado, Honolulu, Hawaii, and elsewhere went off-scale high. Stations in India recorded geomagnetic sudden impulses (GSIs) of 301-486 nT. Estimated AE index peaked at over 3,000 nT and K_{p} reached 9 at several hourly intervals (corresponding to NOAA G5 level).

The magnetosphere compressed rapidly and substantially with the magnetopause reduced to 4-5 R_{E} and the plasmapause (boundary of the plasmasphere, or lower magnetosphere) reduced to 2 R_{E} or less. This is a contraction of at least one half and up to two-thirds the size of the magnetosphere under normal conditions, to a distance of less than 20,000 km (12,000 mi). Solar wind dynamic pressure increased to about 100 times normal, based upon data from Prognoz 1.

== Impacts ==
=== Spacecraft ===
Astronomers first reported unusual flares on 2 August, later corroborated by orbiting spacecraft. On 3 August, Pioneer 9 detected a shock wave and sudden increase in solar wind speed from approximately 217–363 mi/s (349–584 km/s). A shockwave passed Pioneer 10, which was 2.2 AU from the Sun at the time. The greatly constricted magnetosphere caused many satellites to cross outside Earth's protective magnetic field, such boundary crossings into the magnetosheath led to erratic space weather conditions and potentially destructive solar particle bombardment. The Intelsat IV F-2 communications satellite solar panel arrays power generation was degraded by 5%, about 2 years worth of wear. An on-orbit power failure ended the mission of a Defense Satellite Communications System (DSCS II) satellite. Disruptions of Defense Meteorological Satellite Program (DMSP) scanner electronics caused anomalous dots of light in the southern polar cap imagery.

=== Terrestrial effects and aurora ===
On 4 August, an aurora shone so luminously that shadows were cast on the southern coast of the United Kingdom and shortly later as far south as Bilbao, Spain at magnetic latitude 46°. Extending to 5 August, intense geomagnetic storming continued with bright red (a relatively rare color associated with extreme events) and fast-moving aurora visible at midday from dark regions of the Southern Hemisphere.

Radio frequency (RF) effects were rapid and intense. Radio blackouts commenced nearly instantaneously on the sunlit side of Earth on HF and other vulnerable bands. A nighttime mid-latitude E layer developed.

Geomagnetically induced currents (GICs) were generated and produced significant electrical grid disturbances throughout Canada and across much of eastern and central United States, with strong anomalies reported as far south as Maryland and Ohio, moderate anomalies in Tennessee, and weak anomalies in Alabama and north Texas. The voltage collapse of 64% on the North Dakota to Manitoba interconnection would have been sufficient to cause a system breakup if occurring during high export conditions on the line, which would have precipitated a large power outage. Many U.S. utilities in these regions reported no disturbances, with the presence of igneous rock geology a suspected factor, as well as geomagnetic latitude and differences in operational characteristics of respective electrical grids. Manitoba Hydro reported that power going the other way, from Manitoba to the U.S., plummeted 120 MW within a few minutes. Protective relays were repeatedly activated in Newfoundland.

An outage was reported along American Telephone and Telegraph (now AT&T)'s L4 coaxial cable between Illinois and Iowa. Magnetic field variations (dB/dt) of ≈800 nT/min were estimated locally at the time and the peak rate of change of magnetic field intensity reached >2,200 nT/min in central and western Canada, although the outage was most likely caused by swift intensification of the eastward electrojet of the ionosphere. AT&T also experienced a surge of 60 volts on their telephone cable between Chicago and Nebraska. Exceeding the high-current shutdown threshold, an induced electric field was measured at 7.0 V/km. The storm was detected in low-latitude areas such as the Philippines and Brazil, as well as Japan.

=== Military operations ===
The U.S. Air Force's Vela nuclear detonation detection satellites mistook that an explosion occurred, but this was quickly dealt with by personnel monitoring the data in real-time.

The U.S. Navy concluded, as shown in declassified documents, that the seemingly spontaneous detonation of dozens of Destructor magnetic-influence sea mines (DSTs) within about 30 seconds in the Hon La area (magnetic latitude ≈9°) was highly likely the result of an intense solar storm. One account claims that 4,000 mines were detonated. It was known that solar storms caused terrestrial geomagnetic disturbances but it was as yet unknown to the military whether these effects could be sufficiently intense. It was confirmed as possible in a meeting of Navy investigators at the NOAA Space Environment Center (SEC) as well as by other facilities and experts.

=== Human spaceflight ===
Although it occurred between Apollo missions, the storm has long been chronicled within NASA. Apollo 16 returned to Earth on April 27, 1972, with the subsequent (and ultimately final) Apollo Moon landing scheduled to depart on December 7 that same year. Had a mission been taking place during August, those inside the Apollo command module would have been shielded from 90% of the incoming radiation. However, this reduced dose could still have caused acute radiation sickness if the astronauts were located outside the protective magnetic field of Earth, which was the case for much of a lunar mission. An astronaut engaged in EVA in orbit or on a moonwalk could have experienced severe radiation poisoning, or even absorbed a potentially lethal dose. Regardless of location, an astronaut would have suffered an enhanced risk of contracting cancer after being exposed to that amount of radiation.

This was one of only a handful of solar storms which have occurred in the Space Age that could cause severe illness, and was potentially the most hazardous. Had the most intense solar activity of early August occurred during a mission, it would have forced the crew to abort the flight and resort to contingency measures, including an emergency return and landing for medical treatment.

== Implications for heliophysics and society ==
The storm was an important event in the field of heliophysics, the study of space weather, with numerous studies published in the next few years and throughout the 1970s and 1980s, as well as leading to several influential internal investigations and to significant policy changes. Almost fifty years after the fact, the storm was reexamined in an October 2018 article published in the American Geophysical Union (AGU) journal Space Weather. The initial and early studies as well as the later reanalysis studies were only possible due to initial monitoring facilities installed during the International Geophysical Year (IGY) in 1957-1958 and subsequent global scientific cooperation to maintain the data sets. That initial terrestrial data from ground stations and balloons was later combined with spaceborne observatories to form far more complete information than had been previously possible, with this storm being one of the first widely documented of the then young Space Age. It convinced both the military and NASA to take space weather seriously and accordingly devote resources to its monitoring and study.

The authors of the 2018 paper compared the 1972 storm to the great storm of 1859 in some aspects of intensity. They posit that it was a Carrington-class storm. Other researchers conclude that the 1972 event could have been comparable to 1859 for geomagnetic storming if magnetic field orientation parameters were favorable, or as a "failed Carrington-type storm" based on related considerations, which is also the finding of a 2013 Royal Academy of Engineering report.

== See also ==
- List of solar storms
- Military meteorology
- Operation Pocket Money
- Operation End Sweep
- 1972 Great Daylight Fireball, a meteor that passed within 57 km (35 mi) of Earth on 12 August 1972
