= Omicron Aquilae =

Star in the constellation Aquila

ο Aquilae
- Location of ο Aquilae (circled)

Observation data Epoch J2000 Equinox J2000
- Constellation: Aquila
- Right ascension: 19^{h} 51^{m} 01.644^{s}
- Declination: +10° 24′ 56.59″
- Apparent magnitude (V): 5.11

Characteristics
- Spectral type: F8 V + M3 V
- U−B color index: 1.486
- B−V color index: 0.55
- R−I color index: 0.29

Astrometry
Radial velocity (R_{v})	0.036±0.0003 km/s
Proper motion (μ)	RA: +241.713 mas/yr Dec.: −136.695 mas/yr
Parallax (π)	51.3133±0.0898 mas
Distance	63.6 ± 0.1 ly (19.49 ± 0.03 pc)
Absolute magnitude (M_{V})	3.71

Details

ο Aql A
Mass	1.25±0.01 M_{☉}
Radius	1.48±0.03 R_{☉}
Luminosity	2.79±0.13 L_{☉}
Surface gravity (log g)	4.30±0.02 cgs
Temperature	6176±9 K
Metallicity [Fe/H]	+0.137±0.007 dex
Rotational velocity (v sin i)	3 km/s
Age	3.30^{+0.07}_{−0.20} Gyr

ο Aql B
Mass	0.33 M_{☉}
Radius	0.37 R_{☉}
Luminosity	0.015 L_{☉}
Surface gravity (log g)	4.86 cgs
Temperature	3,338 K

Other designations
- ο Aquilae, 54 Aquilae, BD+10 4073, GC 27480, GJ 768.1, GJ 9671, HD 187691, HIP 97675, HR 7560, SAO 1053380, PPM 137097, ADS 13012, WDS J19510+1025A, LTT 15798, NLTT 48319

Database references
SIMBAD	data

Omicron Aquilae is a double star in the equatorial constellation of Aquila. Its name is a Bayer designation that is Latinized from ο Aquilae, and abbreviated Omicron Aql or ο Aql. The brighter component has an apparent visual magnitude of +5.11, which means it is faintly visible to the naked eye in dark suburban skies. The annual parallax shift of this star is 51.3 mas, which is equivalent to a physical distance of 63.6 light-years (19.5 parsecs) from Earth.

The primary component, Omicron Aquilae A, is an F-type main sequence star with a stellar classification of F8 V. It has about 125% of the mass of the Sun and 148% of the Sun's radius. With an age of roughly 3.3 billion years, it appears to spinning at a leisurely rate with a projected rotational velocity of 3 km/s. The outer atmosphere has an effective temperature of 6,123 K, giving it the yellowish-white hue of an F-type star.

In 1998, Omicron Aquilae was one of nine stars identified as experiencing a superflare. The first flare observed from Omicron Aquilae was in 1979, with a magnitude increase of 0.07 and a duration of less than five days. The second occurred in 1980, with a magnitude change of 0.09 and a duration of fifteen days. The energy released during the second flare is estimated as 9×10^{37} erg.

There is a magnitude 12.67 common proper motion companion located at an angular separation of 22.5 arcseconds along a position angle of 221°. Based upon its matching parallax value, this corresponds to a projected separation of 431 astronomical units. (Hence, the companion is located at this separation or greater.) This is confusingly designated WDS J19510+1025C or ο Aquilae B. It is a small red dwarf star with a stellar classification of M3 V. A third star, a magnitude fainter and slightly closer to the primary, is an optical companion that appears near the primary only through a chance alignment.
