= Space climate =

Branch of solar physics and aeronomy

Reconstruction of solar activity over 11,400 years. Period of equally high activity over 8,000 years ago marked.

Space climate is the long-term variation in solar activity within the heliosphere, including the solar wind, the Interplanetary magnetic field (IMF), and their effects in the near-Earth environment, including the magnetosphere of Earth and the ionosphere, the upper and lower atmosphere, climate, and other related systems. The scientific study of space climate is an interdisciplinary field of space physics, solar physics, heliophysics, and geophysics. It is thus conceptually related to terrestrial climatology, and its effects on the atmosphere of Earth are considered in climate science.

== Background ==
Space climatology considers long-term (longer than the latitudinally variable 27-day solar rotation period, through the 11-year solar cycle and beyond, up to and exceeding millennia) variability of solar indices, cosmic ray, heliospheric parameters, and the induced geomagnetic, ionospheric, atmospheric, and climate effects. It studies mechanisms and physical processes responsible for their variability in the past with projections into the future. It is a broader and more general concept than space weather, to which it is related like the conventional climate and weather.

In addition to real-time solar observations, the field of research also covers analysis of historical space climate data. This has included analysis and reconstruction that has allowed solar wind and heliospheric magnetic field strengths to be determined from back to 1611.

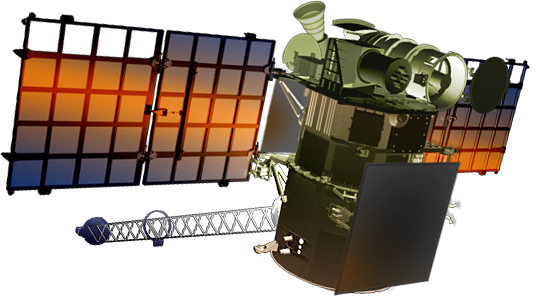
Artist's rendering of Deep Space Climate Observatory (DSCOVR)

The importance of space climate research has been recognized, in particular, by NASA which launched two special space missions, Deep Space Climate Observatory (DSCOVR) and Space Weather Follow On-Lagrange 1 (SWFO-L1) dedicated to monitoring of space climate. New results, ideas and discoveries in the field of Space Climate are published in a focused peer-reviewed research Journal of Space Weather and Space Climate (JSWSC). Since 2013, research awards and medals in space weather and space climate are annually awarded by the European Space Weather Week. Another recent space observatory platform is the Solar Radiation and Climate Experiment (SORCE).

Space climate research has three main aims:

1. to better understand the long-term solar variability, including also the observed extremes and features of this variability in the solar wind and in the heliospheric magnetic field
2. to better understand the physical relationships between the Sun, the heliosphere, and various related proxies (geomagnetic fields, cosmic rays, etc.)
3. to better understand the long-term effect of solar variability on the near-Earth environment, including the different atmospheric layers, and ultimately on Earth's global climate

=== History ===
In the early 2000s, when the concept of space weather became common, a small initiative group, led by Kalevi Mursula and Ilya G. Usoskin the University of Oulu in Finland had realized that physical drivers of solar variability and its terrestrial effects can be better understood with a more general and broader view. The concept of Space Climate had been developed, and the corresponding research community formed, which presently includes a few hundred active members around the world. In particular, a series of International Space Climate Symposia (biennial since 2004) was organized, with the first inaugural symposium being held in Oulu (Finland) in 2004, followed by those in Romania (2006), Finland (2009), India (2011), Finland (2013), Finland (2016), Canada (2019), Poland (2022) and Japan (2024) as well as topical space climate sessions are regularly held at the General Assemblies of the Committee on Space Research and Earth Science.

== Dissemination ==
Research results related to Space Climate are published in a bunch of peer-reviewed journals, such as Astronomy & Astrophysics, Journal of Geophysical Research, Geophysical Research Letters, Solar Physics (journal), Advances in Space Research.

== See also ==
- Aeronomy
- Planetary science, atmospheric sciences, and atmospheric physics
- Solar activity and climate
- Solar irradiance
- Space weather
- Space weathering
- Stellar astronomy
