= July 2012 solar storm =

Notable coronal mass ejection

Solar storm of 2012
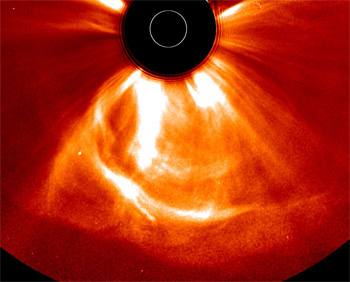
- The coronal mass ejection, as photographed by the STEREO-A COR2 coronagraph. The white circle in the middle of the black disc represents the location and size of the Sun.

Coronal mass ejection
- First observed: July 23, 2012

On July 23, 2012 at 02:08 UTC, a solar storm involving an unusually large and strong coronal mass ejection occurred. It missed Earth by a margin of roughly nine days, as the Sun's equator rotates around its own axis once over a period of about 27 days. The region that produced the outburst was thus not pointed directly towards Earth at that time. The strength of the eruption has been predicted to be comparable to the 1859 Carrington Event that caused damage to electrical equipment worldwide, which at that time consisted mostly of telegraph systems. Had it hit Earth, it is believed that the storm would have caused widespread technological damage.

== Overview ==
The coronal mass ejection as seen by the STEREO-A spacecraft, which took a direct hit.

At 02:08 UT on 23 July 2012, a large coronal mass ejection (CME) was launched from the Sun. The eruption emanated from solar active region 11520 and coincided with what was at most an X2.5-class solar flare. The CME expelled a pair of adjacent magnetic clouds that drove a fast-moving shock wave outward from the Sun. The eruption tore through Earth's orbit, hitting the STEREO-A spacecraft. The spacecraft is a solar observatory equipped to measure such activity, and because it was far away from the Earth and thus not exposed to the strong electrical currents that can be induced when a CME hits the Earth's magnetosphere, it survived the encounter and provided researchers with valuable data. Spacecraft observations recorded the shock wave at 20:55 UTC on 23 July while the magnetic clouds arrived two hours later. The leading shock wave associated with the CME was traveling radially at a speed of around 3,300 km/s (2,100 mi/s) relative to STEREO-A by the time it reached the spacecraft. The CME traveled from the Sun to Earth's orbit in about 20.78 hours, indicating an average speed of 2,000 km/s (1,200 mi/s).

Based on the collected data, the eruption consisted of two separate ejections which were able to reach exceptionally high strength as the interplanetary medium around the Sun had been cleared by a smaller CME four days earlier. Interaction between the primary CME and the preceding CMEs as they traversed the interplanetary medium also led to amplification of the magnetic field of the ejecta that continued by the time the primary CME reached Earth's orbit.

The event occurred at a time of high sunspot activity during solar cycle 24.

=== Predicted effects ===
Had the CME hit Earth, it is likely that it would have inflicted serious damage to electronic systems on a global scale. The resulting geomagnetic storm may have had a strength of −1,150 to −600 nanotesla (0.01-0.005 Gauss), comparable to the impact of the Carrington Event. A 2013 study estimated that the economic cost to the United States would have been between US$600 billion and $2.6 trillion. Ying D. Liu, professor at China's State Key Laboratory of Space Weather, estimated that the recovery time from such a disaster would have been about four to ten years.

Widespread power outages likely would have followed. There would have been similar disruptions to plumbing and water supplies, which rely on electric pumps. Satellite communication would have been impacted, as well as other radio and GPS disruptions occurring. The peripheral effects would have included the loss of perishable foods and medications, climate control systems, phone and communication services, and the ability to dispense fuel.

== Historical comparisons ==
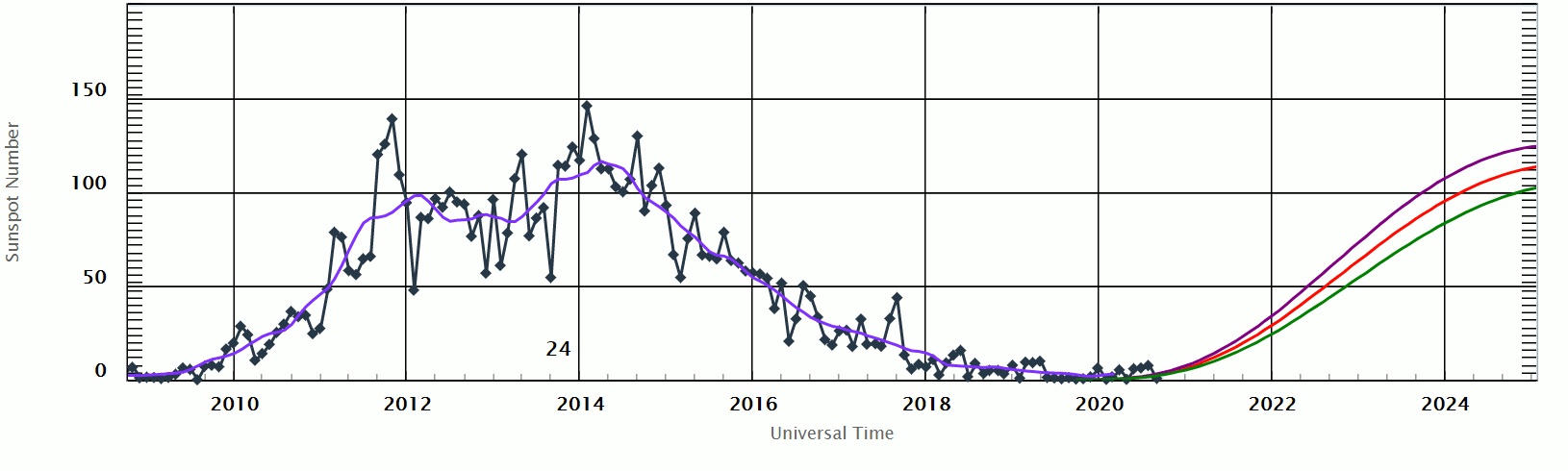
The event occurred in 2012, near the local maximum of sunspots that can be seen in this graph.

Had the event impacted Earth at the same time it occurred, it would have resulted in a geomagnetic storm of comparable strength to the Carrington Event, with a strength around −700 to −800 nanotesla. Had the event happened around the equinox, it likely would have been much stronger, around −1200 nanotesla. The solar cycle involved was near its maximum, but it was relatively weak in comparison to previous solar cycles.

The record fastest CME associated with the August 1972 solar storm is thought to have occurred in a similar process of earlier CMEs clearing particles in the path to Earth. This storm arrived in 14.6 hours, an even shorter duration after the parent flare erupted than for the great solar storm of 1859.

== See also ==
- List of solar storms
