= Ilya G. Usoskin =

Finnish Astrophysicist

Usoskin, Ilya
- Usoskin in 2019
- Born: January 17, 1965 (age 61); Leningrad, USSR
- Education: Peter the Great St. Petersburg Polytechnic University (MSc 1988); Ioffe Institute (Candidate of Sciences 1995); University of Oulu (PhD 2000)
- Known for: Space Climate, Solar Physics, Miyake events
- Spouse: Inna Usoskina
- Awards: Knight, 1st Class, of the Order of the Lion of Finland (2013); Julius Bartels medal of the European Geosciences Union (2018)
- Scientific career
- Fields: Astrophysics, Solar Physics, Cosmic Rays
- Institutions: University of Oulu (1999–present), INFN Milano (1997-1999), Ioffe Institute (1988-1997)
- Thesis: Solar activity changes and modulation of cosmic rays (2000)
- Website: www.oulu.fi/en/researchers/ilya-usoskin

Ilya G. Usoskin is a Finnish astrophysicist who is a professor at University of Oulu and head of Cosmic Ray Station at Sodankylä Geophysical Observatory. He is a Vice President of the International Astronomical Union since 2021.

== Education ==
In 1982, Ilya Usoskin graduated from the Saint Petersburg Lyceum 239 with intensified study of physics and mathematics, in parallel with Grigory Perelman. Then he became a student at the Peter the Great St. Petersburg Polytechnic University and finished it as an MSc in physics (Space Physics) in 1988.

== Career ==
Since 1988, he worked as a junior researcher in the field of Astrophysics at the Ioffe Institute, where he obtained the Candidate of Sciences degree in astrophysics in 1995. During 1997–1999, he was a postdoctoral researcher at the INFN Milano working on the Alpha Magnetic Spectrometer experiment. Since 2000, he has been a staff of the University of Oulu—head of the Oulu Cosmic Ray station.

In 2000, he got PhD in Space Physics, in 2002, he became a Docent, and a full permanent Professor in 2012. In 2014-2015, he was a visiting professor at IPGP. Currently (2025-2027), he is also a Designated professor at Nagoya University.

== Recognition and honors ==
- 2013: Knight's Cross, First Class, of the Order of the Lion of Finland for the promotion of national science.
- 2015-2024: member of C4 (Astroparticle Physics) of IUPAP.
- 2018: Julius Bartels medal of the European Geosciences Union for the foundation of the Space Climate discipline.
- 2019: elected member of the Finnish Academy of Science and Letters.
- 2020: Annual Award of the ISEE of Nagoya University for research of extreme solar events.
- 2021-2027: Vice President of the International Astronomical Union.

== Major research grants ==
- European Research Council Synergy Grant GERACLE (2025–2031) -- PI.
- Finnish Centre of Excellence of the Academy of Finland ReSoLVE (2014–2019) -- (vice) Director.
- Finnish Centre of Excellence of the Research Council of Finland in Space Resilience (2026-2033) -- Task leader

== Research ==
Usoskin works in the fields of Solar Physics, Cosmic Rays, Heliosphere and Space Climate. He has co-authored more than 400 research publications with tens of thousands of citations.

His main research achievements include:

- Foundation of a new research discipline Space Climate, focused on long-term global changes in the terrestrial and near-Earth environment;
- Invention of a novel method to model atmospheric effects of cosmic rays;
- Invention of a novel method of past solar activity reconstructions using cosmogenic isotopes;
- Foundation of a new paradigm of extreme solar events known also as Miyake events.

== Selected publications ==
- Usoskin, Ilya G.; Solanki, Sami K.; Schüssler, Manfred; Mursula, Kalevi; Alanko, Katja (2003), "A Millennium Scale Sunspot Number Reconstruction: Evidence For an Unusually Active Sun Since the 1940s", Physical Review Letters, 91 (21) 211101, arXiv:astro-ph/0310823, Bibcode:2003PhRvL..91u1101U, doi:10.1103/PhysRevLett.91.211101, PMID 14683287
- Solanki, Sami K.; Usoskin, Ilya G.; Kromer, Bernd; Schüssler, Manfred; Beer, Jürg (2004), "Unusual activity of the Sun during recent decades compared to the previous 11,000 years", Nature, 431 (7012): 1084–1087, Bibcode:2004Natur.431.1084S, doi:10.1038/nature02995, PMID 15510145
- Usoskin, I.G.; Alanko-Huotari, K.; Kovaltsov, G.A.; Mursula, K. (2005), "Heliospheric modulation of cosmic rays: Monthly reconstruction for 1951-2004", Journal of Geophysical Research, 110 (A12): A12108, Bibcode:2005JGRA..11012108U, doi:10.1029/2005JA011250
- Usoskin, I.G.; Kovaltsov, G.A. (2006), "Cosmic ray induced ionization in the atmosphere: Full modeling and practical applications", Journal of Geophysical Research, 111 (D21): D21206, Bibcode:2006JGRD..11121206U, doi:10.1029/2006JD007150
- Usoskin, I.G.; Kromer, B.; Ludlow, F.; Beer, J.; Friedrich, M.; Kovaltsov, G.A.; Solanki, S.K.; Wacker, L. (2013), "The AD775 cosmic event revisited: the Sun is to blame", Astronomy and Astrophysics Letters, 552: L3, arXiv:1302.6897, Bibcode:2013A&A...552L...3U, doi:10.1051/0004-6361/201321080
- Usoskin, Ilya G. (2017), "A history of solar activity over millennia", Living Reviews in Solar Physics, 14 (1): 3, arXiv:0810.3972, Bibcode:2017LRSP...14....3U, doi:10.1007/s41116-017-0006-9
- Usoskin, I.G.; Miyake, F.; Baroni, M.; et al. (2023), "Extreme Solar Events: Setting up a Paradigm", Space Science Reviews, 219 (8): 73, Bibcode:2023SSRv..219...73U, doi:10.1007/s11214-023-01018-1, hdl:20.500.11850/641517
- Heaton, T.; Bard, E.; Bayliss, A.; Blaauw, M.; Bronk Ramsey, C.; Reimer, P.J.; Turney, C.S.M.; Usoskin, I.G. (2024), "Extreme solar storms and the quest for exact dating with radiocarbon", Nature, 633: 306, Bibcode:2024Natur.633..306H, doi:10.1038/s41586-024-07679-4
- Vasiliev, V.; Reinhold, T.; Shapiro, A.; Usoskin, I.; et al. (2024), "Sun-like stars produce superflares roughly once per century", Science, 386: 1301, arXiv:2412.12265, doi:10.1126/science.adl5441
