= January 1938 geomagnetic storm =

1938 solar storm

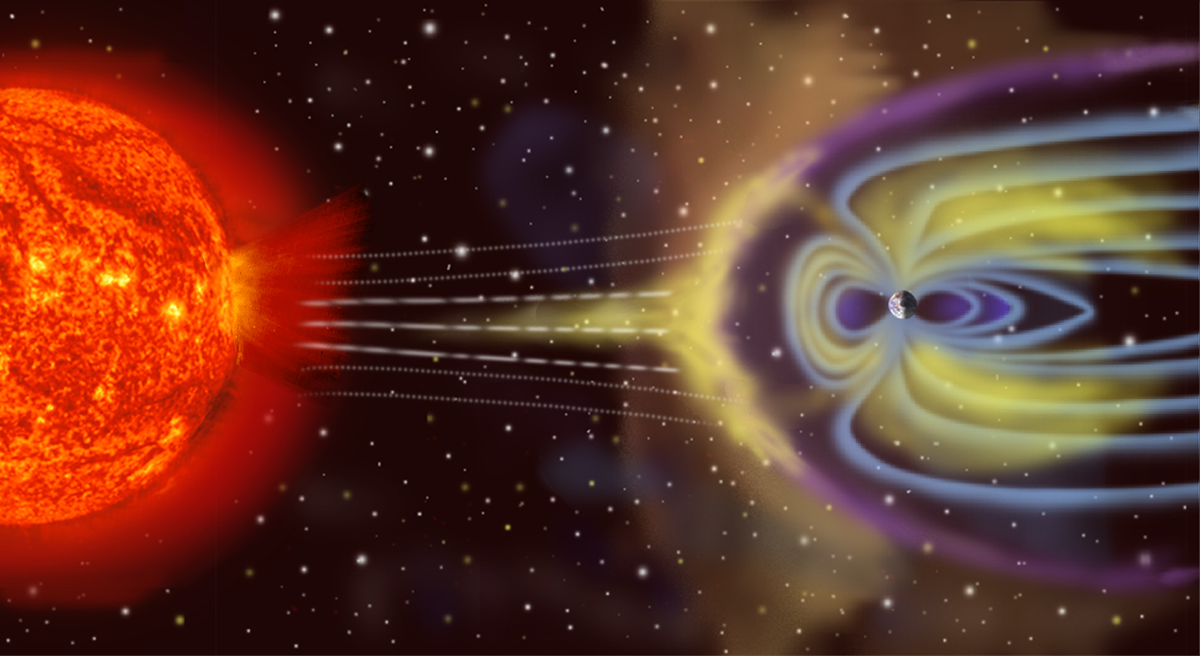
- Artist's depiction of solar wind striking Earth's magnetosphere (size and distance not to scale)

Geomagnetic storm
- Initial onset: 16 January 1938
- Dissipated: 26 January 1938
- Impacts: Global communications blackouts

The 25–26 January 1938 geomagnetic storm (also titled the Fátima Storm) was a massive solar storm, which occurred 16–26 January, with peak activity on 22, 25 and 26 January, and was part of the 17th solar cycle. As the electrification of Europe and North America was still in its infancy, the light storm could be seen brilliantly. The intensely bright arches of crimson light with shifting spectrum of green, blue-white and red radiated from a brilliant auroral crown near the zenith, instead of appearing as usual in parallel lines. This aurora is believed by many people, especially those of the Catholic faith, to be related to the Fátima Prophecies (explained below).

On 25–26 January 1938, the sky was lit up with an aurora borealis light storm, seen all across the world. The storm was identical to other storm-induced, low-latitude aurora borealis. The great aurora that was witnessed across Europe, the Americas, and Oceania had not been seen/documented in Europe since 1709, and in the Americas since 1888. The storm was remarkable primarily because of how far and wide it was observed, and for the brightness of its green strip lights and red glow, which led many to believe the cause was a fire. Reports collected at the time show that the aurora was witnessed in the far north of Canada, and spread as far south as Southern California and on Bermuda in the North Atlantic off of the Carolinas. In Europe, the aurora was seen in Northern Scotland, East Austria, in southern Sicily, Gibraltar and Portugal.

This magnificent display of lights was experienced across the world, as reported in different news archives. The lights sent some into panic, as many were awestruck, astonished by the rarity of the experience. Canada experienced the most vivid auroral displays on the nights of 24–26 January. In the Netherlands, people were awaiting the imminent birth of Princess Juliana's baby, Princess Beatrix, who was eventually born on 31 January 1938: the Dutch considered the aurora as a lucky omen. In Salzburg, Austria, some residents called on the fire department as they believed something was on fire. Alarm bells were rung into a frenzy that night and the fire departments were constantly sounding new alarms, trying to calm the citizens. The loud multitude of ringing further caused panic, causing some residents to flee to more rural areas. The same fright was seen in London where many also believed whole streets were on fire, even the guards of Windsor Castle summoned the fire brigade to put out the said "fire". In Switzerland, the snow-covered peaks of the Swiss Alps were glowing bright and reflecting some of the auroral rays, causing a reflective disco effect. In Descanso, San Diego, the National Forest Service was alerted on the night of 22 January to respond to a "great fire in the backcountry"; after they checked out the back roads, they discovered it was the crimson aurora borealis in the northern sky, which had not been seen in that region since February 1888. In Bermuda, many people believed that a massive freight ship was on fire at sea. Steamship captains were calling the wireless stations to learn if there were any S.O.S calls and if they could help. In Scotland, religious individuals living in the lowlands believed the aurora to be an ill omen for Scotland.

The electrical side effects of the light storm were limited because, at that time, electricity had not been advanced to our modern technological standards. Short-wave radio transmissions were shut down for almost 12 hours, in Canada. In England, the signaling equipment line on the Manchester-Sheffield express trains was inoperable, due to electrical disturbances. These coal trains were halted in their movement and waited at these junctions, for safety reasons. Teletype systems at the New York Western Union offices began to spew out garbage data, suffering electrical shortages.

== The aurora ==
London experienced a thick cloud cover at the beginning of January. The London-based Royal Observatory Greenwich was able to observe a large sunspot on 15 January due to a short break in the cloud cover. The latitude of the sunspot was on the +19° N declination on the sun's hemisphere, and the sunspot at its maximum size covered an area of roughly 3,000 Millionths of the Solar Hemisphere (3,000 MSH). The spot resembled a different spot that was observed in October 1937. Back then, this sunspot became the biggest sunspot observed since records began and trumped the sunspot of the May 1921 geomagnetic storm (which was previously known as the largest sunspot). The magnetic solar storm was detected on 16 January at around 22:30 GMT by the now-defunct Abinger Magnetic Observatory in Surrey, England. A rapid succession of solar flares which created much larger geomagnetic disturbance quickly released towards Earth on 22 January between the hours of 05:00, 09:00 and 10:00. With high frequency, on 25 January, a day after the massive sunspot had disappeared from the direct line of sight over the western side of the Sun, a sudden and rapid barrage of high-frequency waves began at around midday and developed to a new record-breaking high in the evening. A large movement of the recording magnets at Abinger began at around 17:00 and was extremely noteworthy at 20:00 and 21:30, the geomagnetic disturbance only started calming down at around 03:00 in the morning of 26 January.

A witness account by Dr. B.A. Keen, former president of the Royal Meteorological Society had written the following during and after seeing the spectacle: "At Harpenden, the display was seen from 18:45 until well after midnight. The early stages appeared as a red glow in the northwest and later in the northeast, with a low broad green arc in between. The area of the luminous sky increased, and by 20:30 the green color with areas of red extended well south of Orion. Up to 23:00, there seemed to be three periods of brilliant display: the first, and perhaps the best, at 19:45 when a bright red glow in the north-north-east was traversed by many sharply defined green and white shafts, at 20:30 especially in the east; and again at 21:45, when diffuse and rapidly fluctuating green streamers appeared between north-east and north-west, directed towards the Zenith. Thereafter, the luminosity decreased, but as late as 23:00 a broad green arc stretching from northwest to northeast was still clearly visible. About midnight, a fourth display began with red streamers in the northwest, which extended until a broad red band was formed passing through the zenith to the northeast. At 01:00, faint red and green glow was still visible."

== The Fatima Storm ==
The 25–26 January geomagnetic storm of 1938 is alleged by some Roman Catholics to have fulfilled a prophecy by the Carmelite nun, Sister Lúcia Santos. Twenty-one years before, Lúcia and her two cousins allegedly experienced apparitions of a figure, now known as Our Lady of Fátima. The children claimed that the apparition told them three secrets, to be revealed later. The second secret allegedly had to do with the beginning of World War II: "When you see a night illumined by an unknown light, know that this is the great sign given to you by God, that He is about to punish the world for its crimes...". Lúcia wrote that the aurora borealis that took place on this night fulfilled the prophecy, insisting that it was not a natural phenomenon. Some Catholic organizations, such as the Blue Army of Our Lady of Fátima, take the position that the storm was of supernatural origin, though January 1938 was only eight months after the last solar maximum of April 1937, and it takes six years for solar activity to go from maximum back to minimum. Some Catholics have also asserted that the aurora borealis was indeed a natural phenomenon and that the prophecy of the "unknown light" is still to come.

== See also ==
- List of solar storms
