= 774–775 carbon-14 spike =

Observed increase concentration of carbon-14 in tree rings dated 774 or 775

The 774–775 carbon-14 spike is an observed increase of around 1.2% in the concentration of the radioactive carbon-14 isotope in tree rings dated to 774 or 775 CE, which is about 20 times higher than the normal year-to-year variation of radiocarbon in the atmosphere. It was discovered during a study of Japanese cedar tree-rings, with the year of occurrence determined through dendrochronology. A surge in beryllium-10 (^{10}Be), detected in Antarctic ice cores, has also been associated with the 774–775 event. The 774–775 CE carbon-14 spike is one of several Miyake events and it produced the largest and most rapid rise in carbon-14 ever recorded.

The event appears to have been global, with the same carbon-14 signal found in tree rings from Germany, Russia, the United States, Finland, and New Zealand.

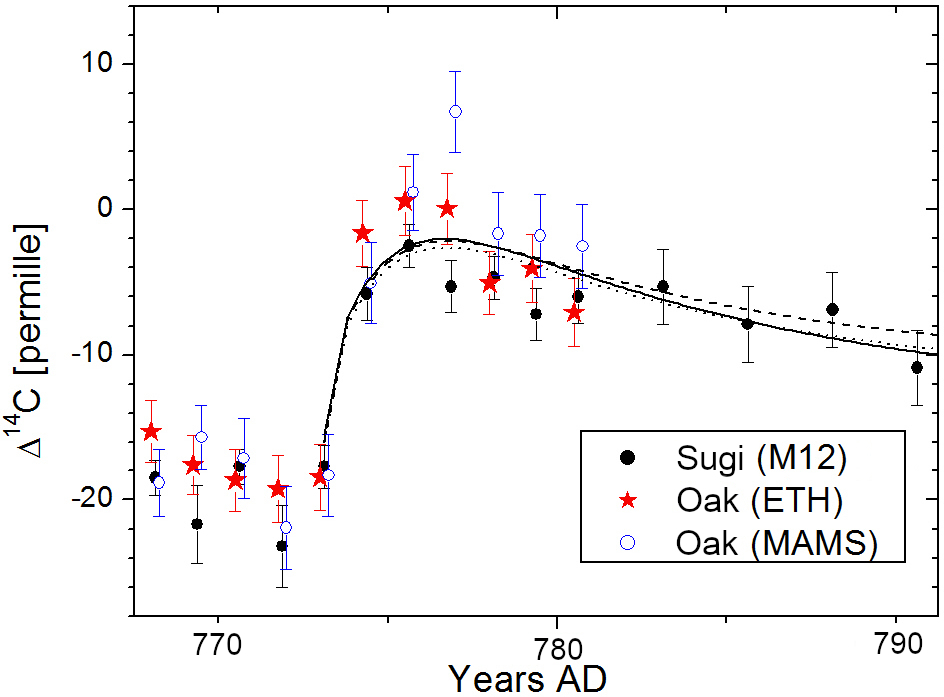
The carbon-14 spike around 774. Colored dots are measurements in Japanese (M12) and German (oak) trees; black lines are the modeled profile corresponding to the instant production of carbon-14.

The signal exhibits a sharp increase of around 1.2% followed by a slow decline, which is consistent with an instant production of carbon-14 in the atmosphere, indicating that the event was short in duration. The globally averaged production of carbon-14 for this event is (1.3 ± 0.2) × 10^{8} atoms/cm^{2}.

== Hypotheses ==
Several possible causes of the event have been considered.

The Anglo-Saxon Chronicle recorded "a red crucifix, after sunset", which has been variously hypothesised to have been a supernova or the aurora borealis.

Annus Domini (the year of the Lord) 774. This year the Northumbrians banished their king, Alred, from York at Easter-tide; and chose Ethelred, the son of Mull, for their lord, who reigned four winters. This year also appeared in the heavens a red crucifix, after sunset; the Mercians and the men of Kent fought at Otford; and wonderful serpents were seen in the land of the South-Saxons.

— Anglo-Saxon Chronicle

In China, there is only one clear reference to an aurora in the mid-770s, on 12 January 776. However, an anomalous "thunderstorm" was recorded for 775.

As established by Ilya G. Usoskin and colleagues, the current scientific paradigm is that the event was caused by a solar particle event (SPE) from a very strong solar flare, perhaps the strongest known. Another proposed origin, involving a gamma-ray burst, is regarded as unlikely, because the event was also observed in isotopes ^{10}Be and ^{36}Cl – a gamma-ray burst would not have produced significant ^{10}Be, and cosmogenic radionuclides are concentrated near the poles, suggesting a flux of charged particles.

== Frequency of similar events ==
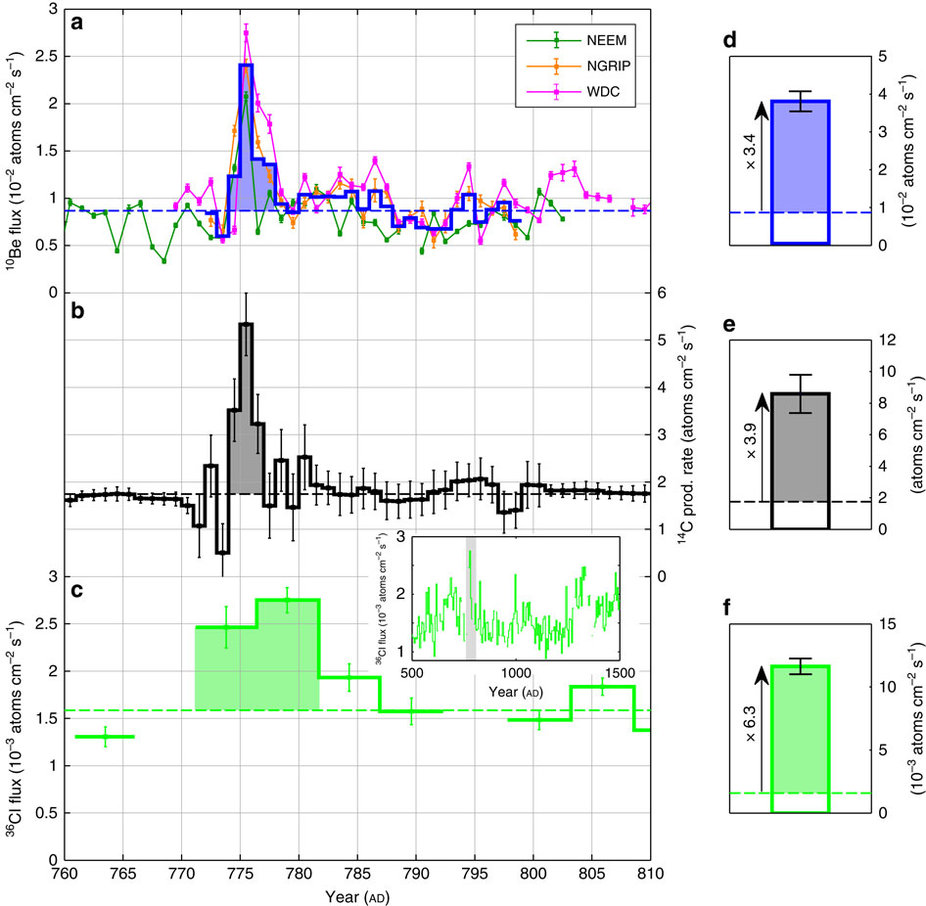
The AD 774/75 event in view of ^{10}Be, ^{14}C, and ^{36}Cl

The event of 774 is the strongest spike over the last 11,000 years in the record of cosmogenic isotopes, but several other events of the same kind (Miyake events) have occurred during the Holocene epoch. The 993–994 carbon-14 spike was about 60% as strong; another event occurred in c. 660 BCE. In 2023 the strongest event yet discovered was reported, which occurred in 12,350-12,349 BC.

The event of 774 had no significant consequences for life on Earth, but if it happened in modern times, it might have produced catastrophic damage to modern technology, particularly to communication and space-borne navigation systems. Also, a solar flare able to produce the observed isotopic effect, would pose considerable risk to astronauts.

^{14}C variations are poorly understood, because annual-resolution measurements are available for only a few periods (such as 774–775). In a 2017 study, a ^{14}C increase of (2.0%) was associated with a 5480 BC event, but it is not associated with a solar event because of its long duration, but rather to an unusually fast grand minimum of solar activity.

== See also ==
- Bomb pulse, a man-made C-14 spike
- Carrington Event
- List of solar storms
