= 993–994 carbon-14 spike =

Solar storm

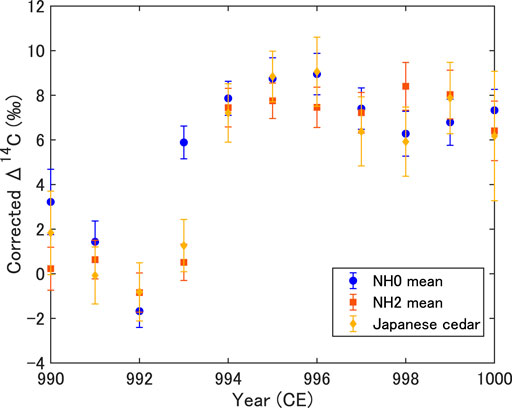
Fig. 1: The carbon-14 spike can be seen 993–994 CE. Colored points represent a studied region around Sweden (NH0) and Japan (NH2); yellow points represent the Japanese cedar analyzed in the study.

The 993–994 carbon-14 spike was a rapid 0.91% increase in carbon-14 isotope content from tree rings dated 993–994 CE. This event was also confirmed with an associated increase of beryllium-10 in Antarctic ice core samples, supporting the hypothesis that this event was of solar origin. There were several astronomical observations during this time that correspond with the ^{14}C and ^{10}Be spikes, but these texts are few and far between.

The 993–994 CE carbon-14 spike is one of several Miyake events.

In 2021, a scientific paper used the 993–994 carbon-14 spike as a benchmark in dendrochronology (tree-ring studies) to precisely determine that Vikings were present in L'Anse aux Meadows in Newfoundland exactly 1,000 years prior, in 1021.

== Historical observations ==
The solar storm hypothesis is heavily supported by several observations of aurora events from late 992 in Korea, Germany and Ireland, usually describing a red sky, presumably because of major auroras. The historical observations do not completely prove the cause of the 993–994 ^{14}C spike but show evidence of a strong solar event taking place late 992, as they were recorded within a relatively short time frame.

In the Korean Peninsula, between December 992 and January 993, a text describes "heaven's gate" opening one night. In the Duchy of Saxony in late 992, several aurora observations were made. One set of observations, recorded October 21, 992, note that the sky reddened three times. Another set of observations, made December 26, 992, mention a light as bright as the sun shining for an hour, then reddening the sky, before vanishing completely. In the Ulster region of present-day Northern Ireland on December 26, 992, texts describe the sky as "blood-red" and having a "fiery hue".

== Similar events ==
The 993–994 carbon-14 spike was one of only a few well-documented ^{14}C events. There had been a considerably larger one, the 774–775 carbon-14 spike, which was around 1.7 times as strong than the 993–994 event. Both events also had subsequent ^{10}Be spikes, which further proves that they are from strong solar activity.

== See also ==
- List of solar storms
- 774–775 carbon-14 spike
- Miyake event
