= Cyclone =

Large scale rotating air mass

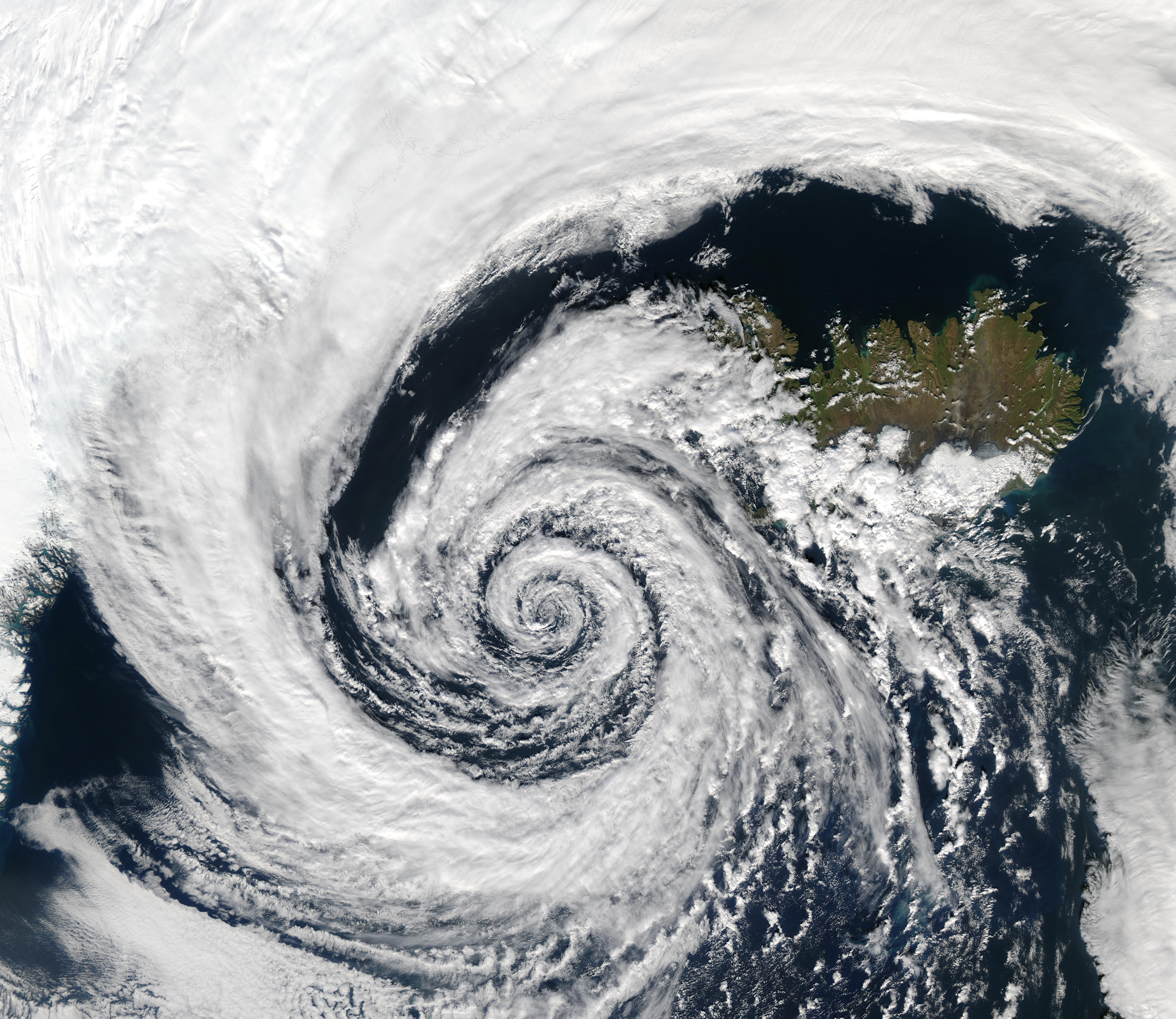
An extratropical cyclone near Iceland

In meteorology, a cyclone (/ˈsaɪ.kloʊn/) is a large air mass that rotates around a strong center of low atmospheric pressure, counterclockwise in the Northern Hemisphere and clockwise in the Southern Hemisphere as viewed from above (opposite to an anticyclone). Cyclones are characterized by inward-spiraling winds that rotate about a zone of low pressure.

Cyclones have also been seen on planets other than the Earth, such as Mars, Jupiter, and Neptune. Cyclogenesis is the process of cyclone formation and intensification.

Extratropical cyclones begin as waves in large regions of enhanced mid-latitude temperature contrasts called baroclinic zones. These zones contract and form weather fronts as the cyclonic circulation closes and intensifies. Later in their life cycle, extratropical cyclones occlude as cold air masses undercut the warmer air and become cold core systems. A cyclone's track is guided over the course of its 2 to 6 day life cycle by the steering flow of the subtropical jet stream.

Weather fronts mark the boundary between two masses of air of different temperature, humidity, and densities, and are associated with the most prominent meteorological phenomena. Strong cold fronts typically feature narrow bands of thunderstorms and severe weather, and may on occasion be preceded by squall lines or dry lines. Such fronts form west of the circulation center and generally move from west to east; warm fronts form east of the cyclone center and are usually preceded by stratiform precipitation and fog. Warm fronts move poleward ahead of the cyclone path. Occluded fronts form late in the cyclone life cycle near the center of the cyclone and often wrap around the storm center.

Tropical cyclogenesis describes the process of development of tropical cyclones. Tropical cyclones form due to latent heat driven by significant thunderstorm activity, and are warm core. Cyclones can transition between extratropical, subtropical, and tropical phases. Mesocyclones form as warm core cyclones over land, and can lead to tornado formation. Waterspouts can also form from mesocyclones, but more often develop from environments of high instability and low vertical wind shear. In the Atlantic and the northeastern Pacific oceans, a tropical cyclone is generally referred to as a hurricane (from the name of the ancient Central American deity of wind, Huracan), in the Indian and south Pacific oceans it is called a cyclone, and in the northwestern Pacific it is called a typhoon. The growth of instability in the vortices is not universal. For example, the size, intensity, moist-convection, surface evaporation, the value of potential temperature at each potential height can affect the nonlinear evolution of a vortex.

== Name ==
The term cyclone comes from the Greek word κύκλος (kýklos, meaning "circle" or "ring" in Ancient Greek), due to the spiraling nature of a cyclone's winds. The word was coined by Henry Piddington, an official in the British East India Company who published 40 papers dealing with tropical storms from Calcutta between 1836 and 1855 in The Journal of the Asiatic Society.

== Structure ==
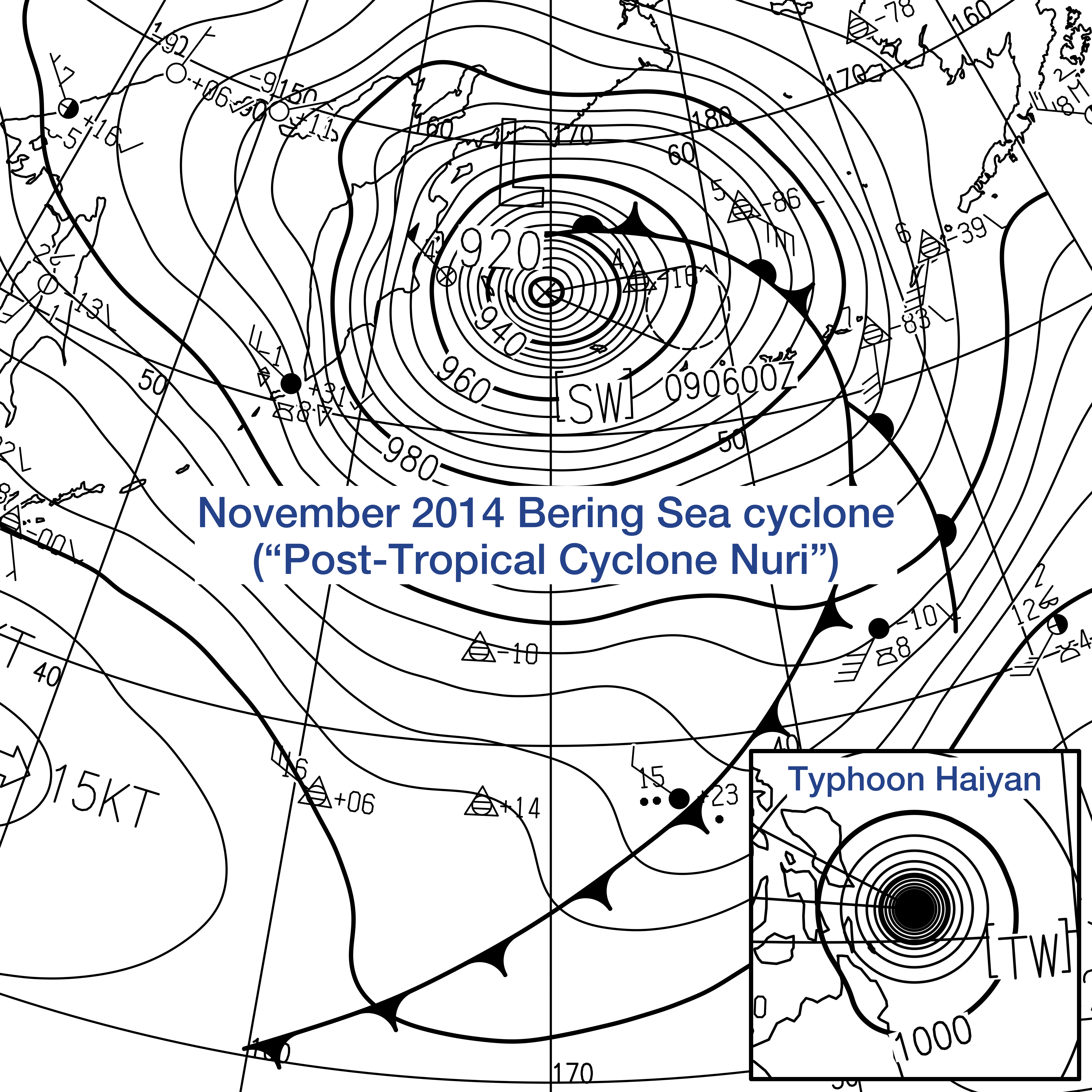
Comparison between extratropical and tropical cyclones on surface analysis

There are a number of structural characteristics common to all cyclones. A cyclone is a low-pressure area. A cyclone's center (often known in a mature tropical cyclone as the eye), is the area of lowest atmospheric pressure in the region. Near the center, the pressure gradient force (from the pressure in the center of the cyclone compared to the pressure outside the cyclone) and the force from the Coriolis effect must be in an approximate balance, or the cyclone would collapse on itself as a result of the difference in pressure.

Because of the Coriolis effect, the wind flow around a large cyclone is counterclockwise in the Northern Hemisphere and clockwise in the Southern Hemisphere. In the Northern Hemisphere, the fastest winds relative to the surface of the Earth therefore occur on the eastern side of a northward-moving cyclone and on the northern side of a westward-moving one; the opposite occurs in the Southern Hemisphere.

== Formation ==
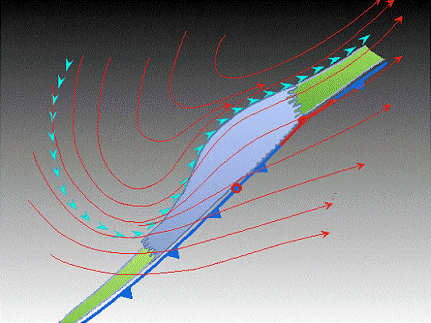
The initial extratropical low-pressure area forms at the location of the red dot on the image. It is usually perpendicular (at a right angle to) the leaf-like cloud formation seen on satellite during the early stage of cyclogenesis. The location of the axis of the upper level jet stream is in light blue.

Tropical cyclones form when the energy released by the condensation of moisture in rising air causes a positive feedback loop over warm ocean waters.

Cyclogenesis is the development or strengthening of cyclonic circulation in the atmosphere. Cyclogenesis is an umbrella term for several different processes that all result in the development of some sort of cyclone.

Tropical cyclones form as a result of significant convective activity, and are warm core. Mesocyclones form as warm core cyclones over land, and can lead to tornado formation. Waterspouts can also form from mesocyclones, but more often develop from environments of high instability and low vertical wind shear. Cyclolysis is the opposite of cyclogenesis, and is the high-pressure system equivalent, which deals with the formation of high-pressure areas—anticyclogenesis.

A surface low can form in a variety of ways. Topography can create a surface low. Mesoscale convective systems can spawn surface lows that are initially warm-core. The disturbance can grow into a wave-like formation along the front and the low is positioned at the crest. Around the low, the flow becomes cyclonic. This rotational flow moves polar air towards the equator on the west side of the low, while warm air move towards the pole on the east side. A cold front appears on the west side, while a warm front forms on the east side. Usually, the cold front moves at a quicker pace than the warm front and "catches up" with it due to the slow erosion of higher density air mass out ahead of the cyclone. In addition, the higher density air mass sweeping in behind the cyclone strengthens the higher pressure, denser cold air mass. The cold front over takes the warm front, and reduces the length of the warm front. At this point an occluded front forms where the warm air mass is pushed upwards into a trough of warm air aloft, which is also known as a trowal.

Tropical cyclogenesis is the development and strengthening of a tropical cyclone. The mechanisms by which tropical cyclogenesis occurs are distinctly different from those that produce mid-latitude cyclones. Tropical cyclogenesis, the development of a warm-core cyclone, begins with significant convection in a favorable atmospheric environment. There are two main requirements for tropical cyclogenesis: sufficiently warm sea surface temperatures, and low vertical wind shear.

An average of 86 tropical cyclones of tropical storm intensity form annually worldwide, with 47 reaching hurricane/typhoon strength, and 20 becoming intense tropical cyclones (at least Category 3 intensity on the Saffir–Simpson hurricane scale).

== Synoptic types ==
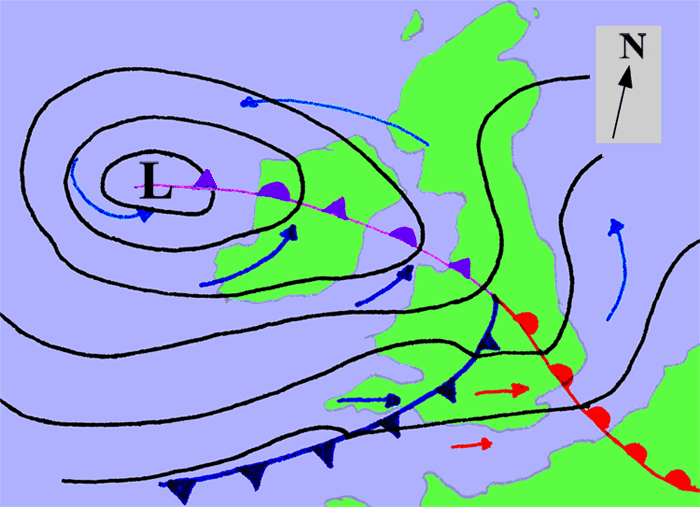
A fictitious synoptic chart of an extratropical cyclone affecting the UK and Ireland. The blue arrows between isobars indicate the direction of the wind, while the "L" symbol denotes the centre of the "low". Note the occluded, cold and warm frontal boundaries.

The following types of cyclones are identifiable in synoptic charts.

=== Surface-based types ===
There are three main types of surface-based cyclones: extratropical cyclones, subtropical cyclones and tropical cyclones.

==== Extratropical cyclone ====
An extratropical cyclone is a synoptic scale low-pressure weather system that does not have tropical characteristics, as it is connected with fronts and horizontal gradients (rather than vertical) in temperature and dew point otherwise known as "baroclinic zones".

"Extratropical" is applied to cyclones outside the tropics, in the middle latitudes. These systems may also be described as "mid-latitude cyclones" due to their area of formation, or "post-tropical cyclones" when a tropical cyclone has moved (extratropical transition) beyond the tropics. They are often described as "depressions" or "lows" by weather forecasters and the general public. These are the everyday phenomena that, along with anticyclones, drive weather over much of the Earth.

Although extratropical cyclones are almost always classified as baroclinic since they form along zones of temperature and dewpoint gradient within the westerlies, they can sometimes become barotropic late in their life cycle when the temperature distribution around the cyclone becomes fairly uniform with radius. An extratropical cyclone can transform into a subtropical storm, and from there into a tropical cyclone, if it dwells over warm waters sufficient to warm its core, and as a result develops central convection. A particularly intense type of extratropical cyclone that strikes during winter is known colloquially as a nor'easter.

==== Polar low ====
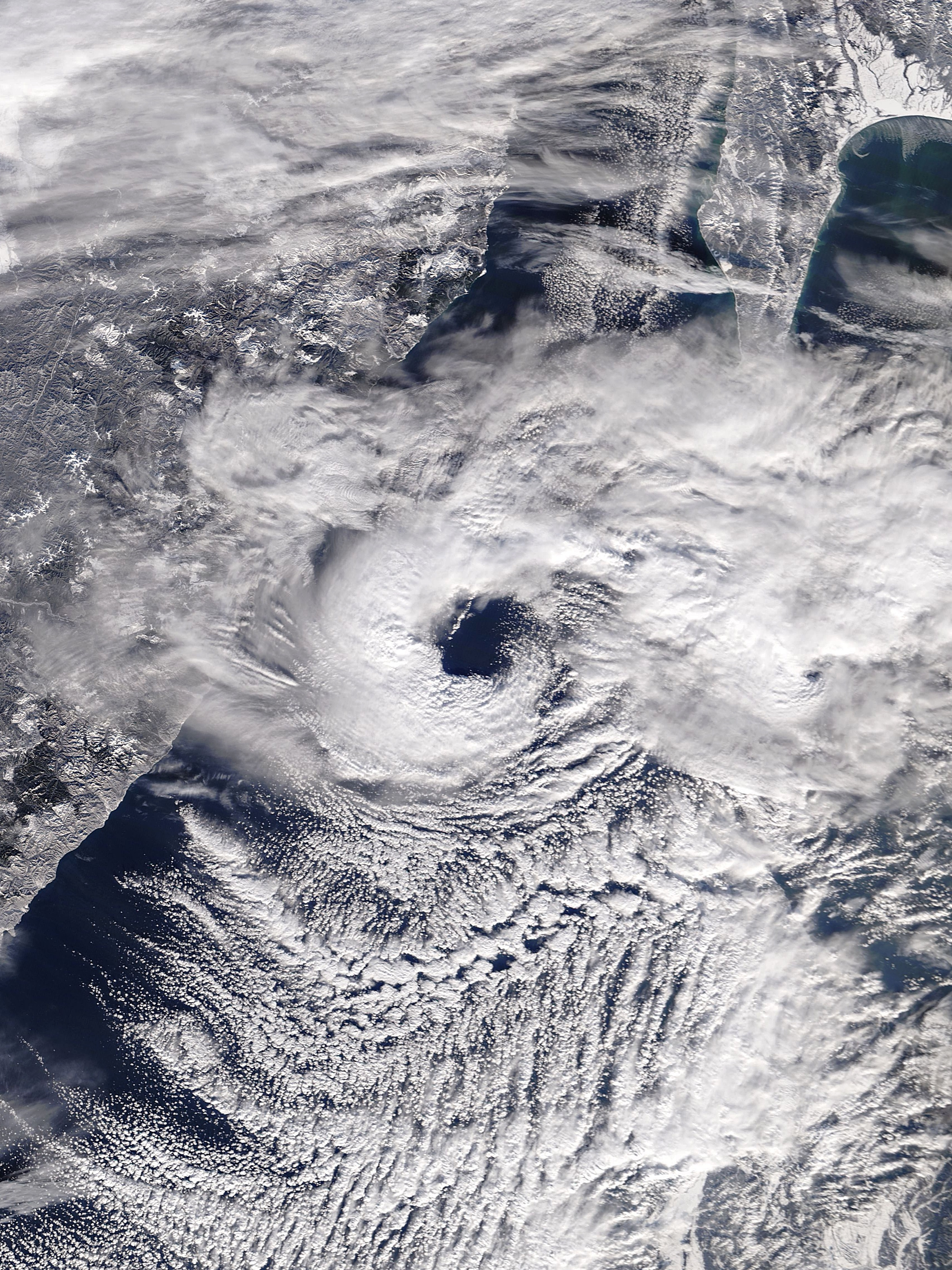
A polar low over the Sea of Japan in December 2009

A polar low is a small-scale, short-lived atmospheric low-pressure system (depression) that is found over the ocean areas poleward of the main polar front in both the Northern and Southern Hemispheres. Polar lows were first identified on the meteorological satellite imagery that became available in the 1960s, which revealed many small-scale cloud vortices at high latitudes. The most active polar lows are found over certain ice-free maritime areas in or near the Arctic during the winter, such as the Norwegian Sea, Barents Sea, Labrador Sea and Gulf of Alaska. Polar lows dissipate rapidly when they make landfall. Antarctic systems tend to be weaker than their northern counterparts since the air-sea temperature differences around the continent are generally smaller. However, vigorous polar lows can be found over the Southern Ocean.

During winter, when cold-core lows with temperatures in the mid-levels of the troposphere reach −45 °C (−49 °F) move over open waters, deep convection forms, which allows polar low development to become possible. The systems usually have a horizontal length scale of less than 1,000 kilometres (620 mi) and exist for no more than a couple of days. They are part of the larger class of mesoscale weather systems. Polar lows can be difficult to detect using conventional weather reports and are a hazard to high-latitude operations, such as shipping and gas and oil platforms. Polar lows have been referred to by many other terms, such as polar mesoscale vortex, Arctic hurricane, Arctic low, and cold air depression. Today the term is usually reserved for the more vigorous systems that have near-surface winds of at least 17 m/s (38 mph; 61 km/h).

==== Subtropical ====
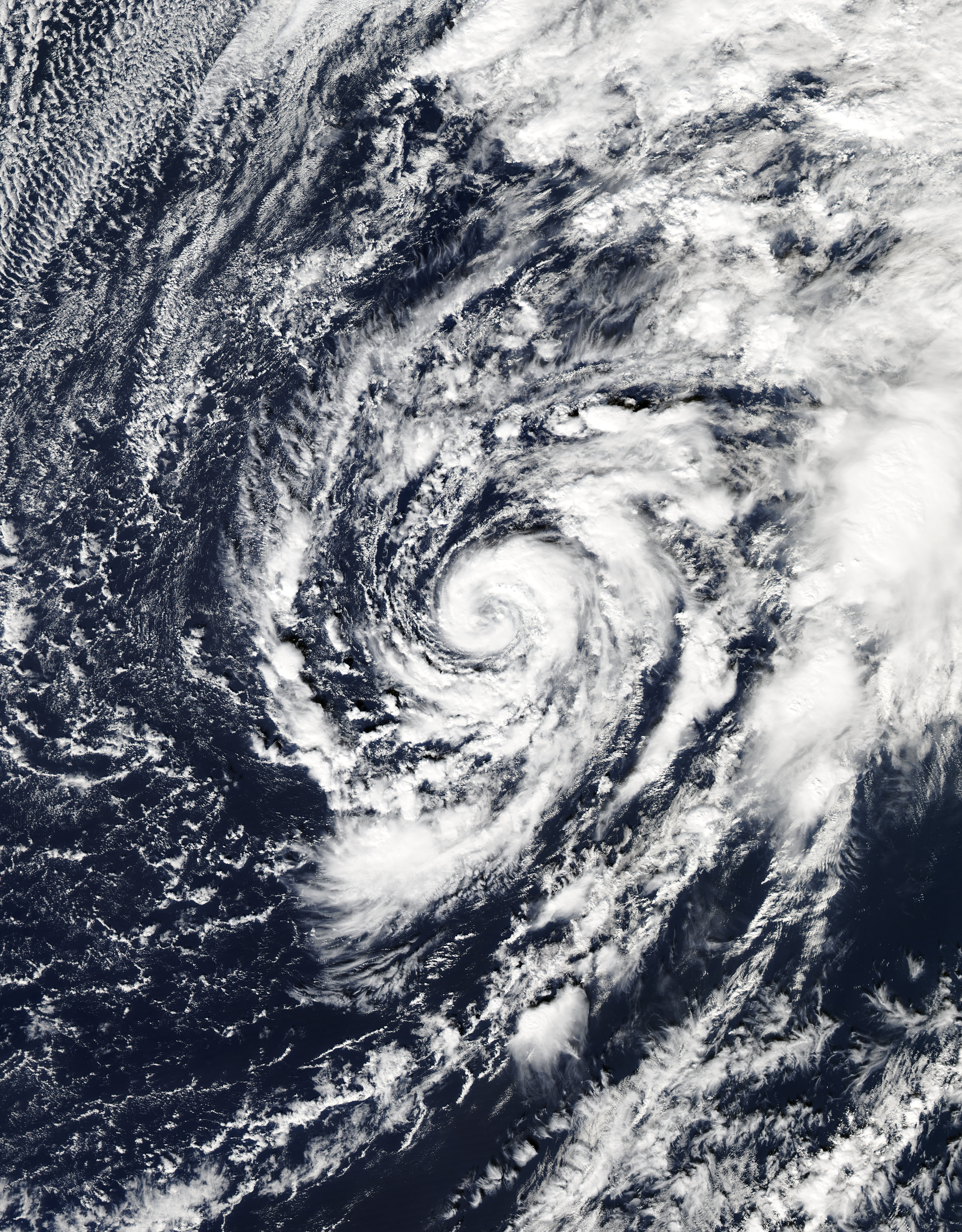
Subtropical Storm Alex in the north Atlantic Ocean in January 2016

A subtropical cyclone is a weather system that has some characteristics of a tropical cyclone and some characteristics of an extratropical cyclone. They can form between the equator and the 50th parallel. As early as the 1950s, meteorologists were unclear whether they should be characterized as tropical cyclones or extratropical cyclones, and used terms such as quasi-tropical and semi-tropical to describe the cyclone hybrids. By 1972, the National Hurricane Center in the United States officially recognized this cyclone category. Subtropical cyclones began to receive names off the official tropical cyclone list in the Atlantic Basin in 2002. They have broad wind patterns with maximum sustained winds located farther from the center than typical tropical cyclones, and exist in areas of weak to moderate temperature gradient.

Since they form from extratropical cyclones, which have colder temperatures aloft than normally found in the tropics, the sea surface temperatures required is around 23 degrees Celsius (73 °F) for their formation, which is three degrees Celsius (5 °F) lower than for tropical cyclones. This means that subtropical cyclones are more likely to form outside the traditional bounds of the hurricane season. Although subtropical storms rarely have hurricane-force winds, they may become tropical in nature as their cores warm.

==== Tropical ====
Wind damage varies exponentially with wind speed, so that small increases in wind strength can dramatically increase damage. Damages rise by about a factor of four for every category increase in the Saffir–Simpson scale.

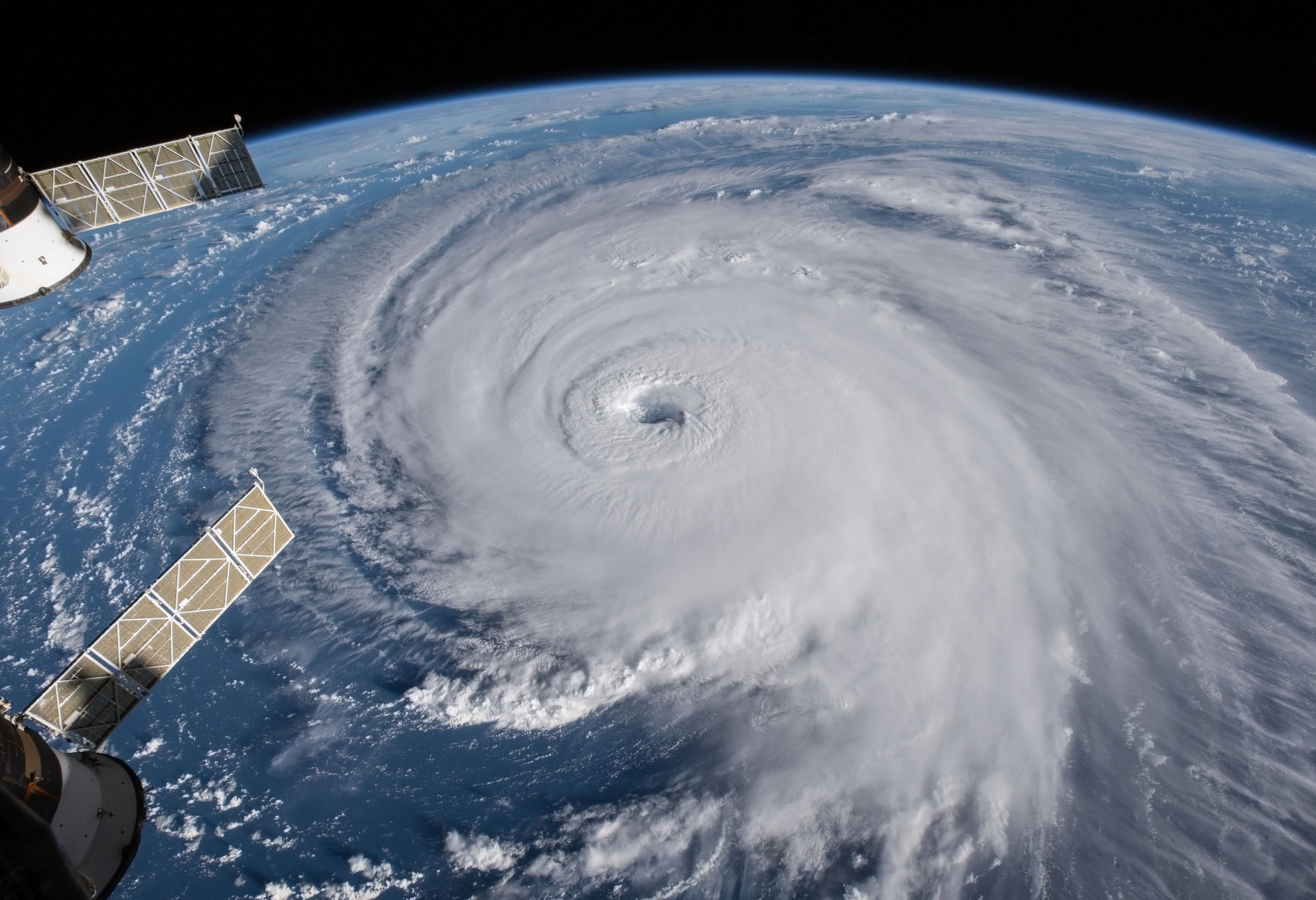
Hurricane Florence viewed from the International Space Station

A tropical cyclone is a storm system characterized by a low-pressure center and numerous thunderstorms that produce strong winds and flooding rain. A tropical cyclone feeds on heat released when moist air rises, resulting in condensation of water vapour contained in the moist air. They are fueled by a different heat mechanism than other cyclonic windstorms such as nor'easters, European windstorms, and polar lows, leading to their classification as "warm core" storm systems.

Terminology for tropical cyclones on a world map

The term "tropical" refers to both the geographic origin of these systems, which form almost exclusively in tropical regions of the globe, and their dependence on Maritime Tropical air masses for their formation. The term "cyclone" refers to the storms' cyclonic nature, with counterclockwise rotation in the Northern Hemisphere and clockwise rotation in the Southern Hemisphere. Depending on their location and strength, tropical cyclones are referred to by other names, such as hurricane, typhoon, tropical storm, cyclonic storm, tropical depression, or simply as a cyclone.

While tropical cyclones can produce extremely powerful winds and torrential rain, they are also able to produce high waves and a damaging storm surge. Their winds increase the wave size, and in so doing they draw more heat and moisture into their system, thereby increasing their strength. They develop over large bodies of warm water, and hence lose their strength if they move over land. This is the reason coastal regions can receive significant damage from a tropical cyclone, while inland regions are relatively safe from strong winds. Heavy rains, however, can produce significant flooding inland. Storm surges are rises in sea level caused by the reduced pressure of the core that in effect "sucks" the water upward and from winds that in effect "pile" the water up. Storm surges can produce extensive coastal flooding up to 40 kilometres (25 mi) from the coastline. Although their effects on human populations can be devastating, tropical cyclones can also relieve drought conditions. They also carry heat and energy away from the tropics and transport it toward temperate latitudes, which makes them an important part of the global atmospheric circulation mechanism. As a result, tropical cyclones help to maintain equilibrium in the Earth's troposphere.

Many tropical cyclones develop when the atmospheric conditions around a weak disturbance in the atmosphere are favorable. Others form when other types of cyclones acquire tropical characteristics. Tropical systems are then moved by steering winds in the troposphere; if the conditions remain favorable, the tropical disturbance intensifies, and can even develop an eye. On the other end of the spectrum, if the conditions around the system deteriorate or the tropical cyclone makes landfall, the system weakens and eventually dissipates. A tropical cyclone can become extratropical as it moves toward higher latitudes if its energy source changes from heat released by condensation to differences in temperature between air masses. A tropical cyclone is usually not considered to become subtropical during its extratropical transition.

=== Upper level types ===
==== Polar cyclone ====
A polar, sub-polar, or Arctic cyclone (also known as a polar vortex) is a vast area of low pressure that strengthens in the winter and weakens in the summer. A polar cyclone is a low-pressure weather system, usually spanning 1,000 kilometres (620 mi) to 2,000 kilometres (1,200 mi), in which the air circulates in a counterclockwise direction in the Northern Hemisphere, and a clockwise direction in the Southern Hemisphere. The Coriolis acceleration acting on the air masses moving poleward at high altitude, causes a counterclockwise circulation at high altitude. The poleward movement of air originates from the air circulation of the Polar cell. The polar low is not driven by convection as are tropical cyclones, nor the cold and warm air mass interactions as are extratropical cyclones, but is an artifact of the global air movement of the Polar cell. The base of the polar low is in the mid to upper troposphere. In the Northern Hemisphere, the polar cyclone has two centers on average. One center lies near Baffin Island and the other over northeast Siberia. In the Southern Hemisphere, it tends to be located near the edge of the Ross Ice Shelf near 160 west longitude. When the polar vortex is strong, its effect can be felt at the surface as a westerly wind (toward the east). When the polar cyclone is weak, significant cold outbreaks occur.

==== TUTT cell ====
Under specific circumstances, upper level cold lows can break off from the base of the tropical upper tropospheric trough (TUTT), which is located mid-ocean in the Northern Hemisphere during the summer months. These upper tropospheric cyclonic vortices, also known as TUTT cells or TUTT lows, usually move slowly from east-northeast to west-southwest, and their bases generally do not extend below 20,000 feet (6,100 m) in altitude. A weak inverted surface trough within the trade wind is generally found underneath them, and they may also be associated with broad areas of high-level clouds. Downward development results in an increase of cumulus clouds and the appearance of a surface vortex. In rare cases, they become warm-core tropical cyclones. Upper cyclones and the upper troughs that trail tropical cyclones can cause additional outflow channels and aid in their intensification. Developing tropical disturbances can help create or deepen upper troughs or upper lows in their wake due to the outflow jet emanating from the developing tropical disturbance/cyclone.

== Non-synoptic types ==
The following types of cyclones are not identifiable in synoptic charts.

=== Mesocyclone ===
A mesocyclone is a vortex of air, 2.0 kilometres (1.2 mi) to 10 kilometres (6.2 mi) in diameter (the mesoscale of meteorology), within a convective storm. Air rises and rotates around a vertical axis, usually in the same direction as low-pressure systems in both northern and southern hemisphere. They are most often cyclonic, that is, associated with a localized low-pressure region within a supercell. Such storms can feature strong surface winds and severe hail. Mesocyclones often occur together with updrafts in supercells, where tornadoes may form. About 1,700 mesocyclones form annually across the United States, but only half produce tornadoes.

=== Dust devil ===
A dust devil is a type of vortex that involves debris such as dust being lifted upward into the air. Most dust devils are between 10 ft (3.0 m) and 300 ft (91 m) wide, and between 500 ft (150 m) and 1,000 ft (300 m) tall, although the strongest can be several thousand feet tall. Wind speed varies depending on the size of the dust devil; larger ones have winds of at least 60 mph (97 km/h), reaching up to 75 mph (121 km/h). Dust devils form from a warm surface during sunny days, often in an area where surface types change, and require the surrounding air to be unstable, dissipating when conditions become more stable; they therefore often form in deserts. They usually dissipate after only a few minutes, but stronger dust devils can last over an hour. Dust devils are smaller than tornadoes and are usually harmless, though stronger ones can destroy small structures. Dust devils have been found on Mars as well as on Earth.

=== Waterspout ===
A waterspout is a columnar vortex forming over water that is, in its most common form, a non-supercell tornado over water that is connected to a cumuliform cloud. While it is often weaker than most of its land counterparts, stronger versions spawned by mesocyclones do occur.

=== Steam devil ===
A steam devil is a gentle vortex over calm water or wet land that is made visible by rising water vapour.

=== Fire whirl ===
A fire whirl – also colloquially known as a fire devil, fire tornado, firenado, or fire twister – is a whirlwind induced by a fire and often made up of flame or ash.

== Other planets ==
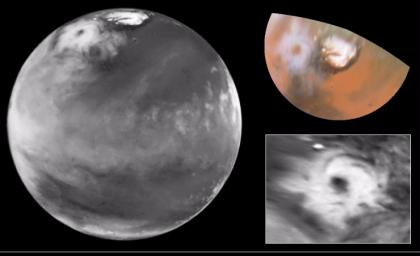
Cyclone on Mars, imaged by the Hubble Space Telescope

Cyclones are not unique to Earth. Cyclonic storms are common on giant planets, such as the Small Dark Spot on Neptune. It is about one third the diameter of the Great Dark Spot and received the nickname "Wizard's Eye" because it looks like an eye. This appearance is caused by a white cloud in the middle of the Wizard's Eye. Mars has also exhibited cyclonic storms. Jovian storms like the Great Red Spot are usually mistakenly named as giant hurricanes or cyclonic storms. However, this is inaccurate, as the Great Red Spot is, in fact, the inverse phenomenon, an anticyclone.

== See also ==
- Tropical cyclone
- Subtropical cyclone
- Extratropical cyclone
- Tornado
- Storm
- Atlantic hurricane
- Australian region tropical cyclone
- Space hurricane
- Space tornado
