= Particle-beam weapon =

Hypothetical type of weapon

A particle-beam weapon uses a high-energy beam of atomic or subatomic particles to damage the target by disrupting its atomic and/or molecular structure. A particle-beam weapon is a type of directed-energy weapon, which directs focused energy toward a target using atomic scale particles. Some particle-beam weapons have potential practical applications, e.g. as an antiballistic missile defense or detection system. They have been known by several names: particle accelerator guns, ion cannons, proton beams, lightning rays, rayguns, etc.

The concept of particle-beam weapons comes from sound scientific principles and experiments. One process is to simply overheat a target until it is no longer operational. However, after decades of research and development, particle-beam weapons remain at the research stage, and it remains to be seen if or when they will be deployed as practical, high-performance military weapons.

Particle accelerators are a well-developed technology used in scientific research. They use electromagnetic fields to accelerate and direct charged particles along a predetermined path, and a magnetic lens system to focus these streams on a target. The cathode-ray tube in many twentieth-century televisions and computer monitors is a very simple type of particle accelerator. More powerful versions include synchrotrons and cyclotrons used in nuclear research. A particle-beam weapon is a weaponized version of this technology. It accelerates charged particles (in most cases electrons, positrons, protons, or ionized atoms, but very advanced versions can accelerate other particles such as mercury nuclei) to near-light speed and then directs them towards a target. The particles' kinetic energy is imparted to matter in the target, inducing near-instantaneous and catastrophic superheating at the surface, and when penetrating deeper, ionization effects can upset or destroy electronics. However, many accelerators used for high-energy nuclear physics are quite large (sometimes on the order of kilometers in length, such as the LHC), with highly constrained construction, operation, and maintenance requirements. If an accelerator is to be deployed in space, it has to be lightweight and robust.

== Beam generation ==
Charged particle beams naturally diverge because of mutual repulsion, and are deflected by the earth’s magnetic field. Neutral particle beams (NPBs) can remain better focused and are not subject to deflection by the earth’s magnetic field. Neutral particle beams are ionized, accelerated while ionized, then neutralized before leaving the device. Neutral beams also reduce spacecraft charging.

Particle accelerators can accelerate negatively charged hydrogen ions to velocities approaching the speed of light. Each ion has a kinetic energy range of 100-1000+ MeV. The resulting high-energy negative hydrogen ions can be electrically neutralized by stripping one electron per ion in a neutralizer cell. This creates an electrically neutral beam of high-energy hydrogen atoms, that can proceed in a straight line at near the speed of light to hit the target.

The beam emitted may contain 1+ gigajoule of kinetic energy. The speed of a beam approaching that of light in combination with the energy deposited in the target was thought to negate any realistic defense. Target hardening through shielding or materials selection was thought to be impractical or ineffective in 1984, especially if the beam could sustain full power and precise focus on the target. Neutral particle beams with much lower beam power could also be used to detect nuclear weapons in space non-destructively.

== History ==
The U.S. Strategic Defense Initiative developed a neutral particle beam system to be used as a weapon or a detector of nuclear weapons in outer space. Neutral beam accelerator technology was developed at Los Alamos National Laboratory in New Mexico. A prototype NPB linear accelerator was launched aboard a suborbital Aries (rocket) in July 1989 as part of the Beam Experiments Aboard Rocket (BEAR) project. It reached a maximum altitude of over 200 km, and successfully operated autonomously in space before returning to earth intact. In 2006, the BEAR accelerator was transferred from Los Alamos to the Smithsonian Air and Space Museum in Washington, DC.

== See also ==
- Anti-satellite weapon
- Golden Dome (missile defense system)
- Raygun
