= Scatha =

Scatha may refer to:

- Scatha the Worm, a fictional dragon from J. R. R. Tolkien's Middle-earth legendarium
- Scáthach, a Celtic warrior goddess from Scotland
- SCATHA (Spacecraft Charging At High Altitudes), a United States Air Force satellite designed to collect data on the electrical charging of spacecraft
