= Space weather =

Branch of space physics and aeronomy

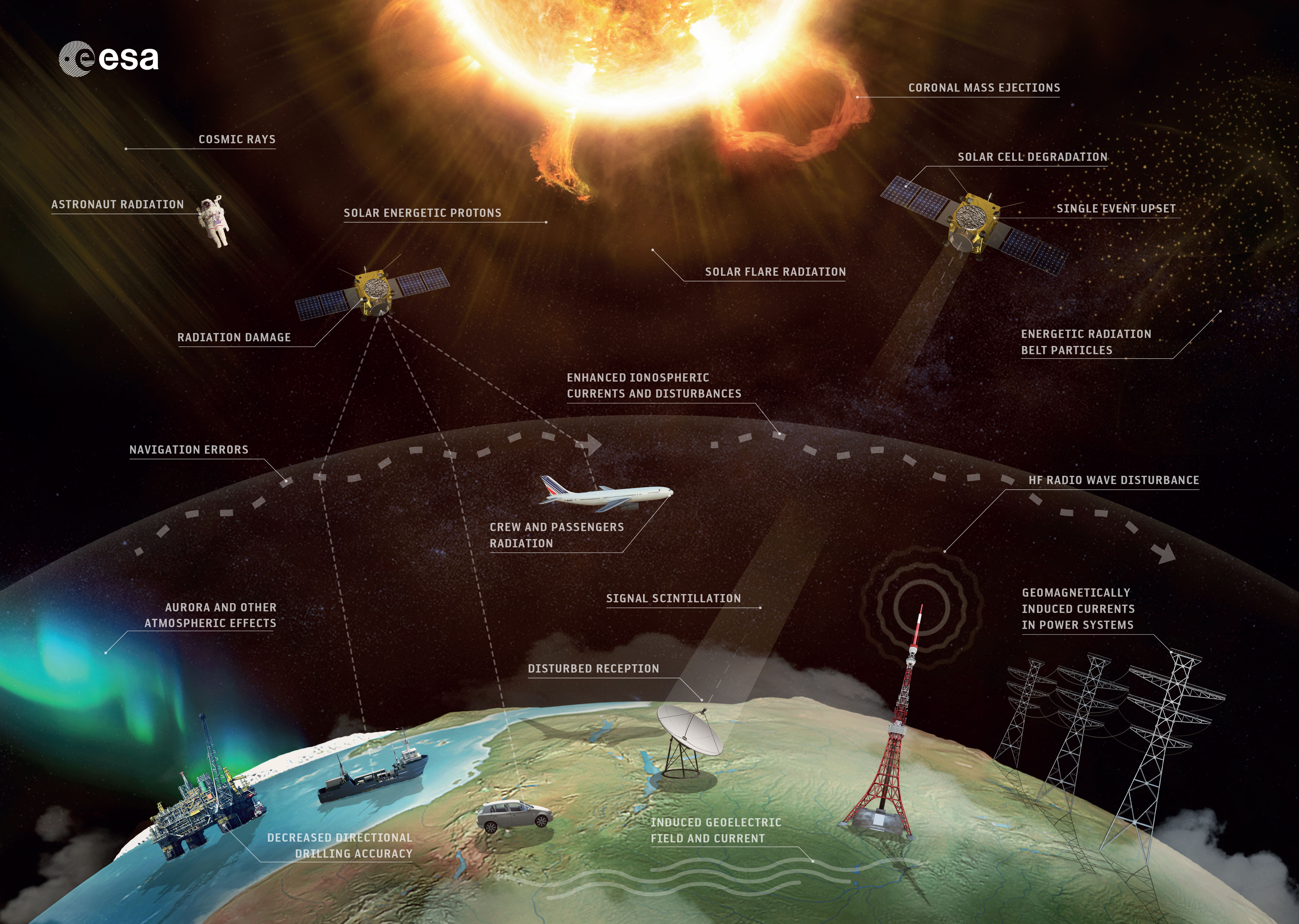
Space weather effects

Space weather is a branch of space physics and aeronomy, or heliophysics, concerned with the varying conditions within the Solar System and its heliosphere. This includes the effects of the solar wind, especially on the Earth's magnetosphere, ionosphere, thermosphere, and exosphere. Though physically distinct, space weather is analogous to the terrestrial weather of Earth's atmosphere (troposphere and stratosphere). The term "space weather" was first used in the 1950s and popularized in the 1990s. Later, it prompted research into "space climate", the large-scale and long-term patterns of space weather.

== History ==
For many centuries, the effects of space weather were noticed, but not understood. Displays of auroral light have long been observed at high latitudes.

=== Beginnings ===
In 1724, George Graham reported that the needle of a magnetic compass was regularly deflected from magnetic north over the course of each day. This effect was eventually attributed to overhead electric currents flowing in the ionosphere and magnetosphere by Balfour Stewart in 1882, and confirmed by Arthur Schuster in 1889 from analysis of magnetic observatory data.

In 1852, astronomer and British Major General Edward Sabine showed that the probability of the occurrence of geomagnetic storms on Earth was correlated with the number of sunspots, demonstrating a novel solar-terrestrial interaction. The solar storm of 1859 caused brilliant auroral displays and disrupted global telegraph operations. Richard Carrington correctly connected the storm with a solar flare that he had observed the day before near a large sunspot group, demonstrating that specific solar events could affect the Earth.

Kristian Birkeland explained the physics of aurorae by creating artificial ones in his laboratory, and predicted the solar wind.

The introduction of radio revealed that solar weather could cause extreme static or noise. Radar jamming during a large solar event in 1942 led to the discovery of solar radio bursts, radio waves over a broad frequency range created by a solar flare.

=== The 20th century ===
In the 20th century, the interest in space weather expanded as military and commercial systems came to depend on systems that could be affected by space weather. Communications satellites are a vital part of global commerce. Weather satellite systems provide information about terrestrial weather. The signals from satellites of a global positioning system (GPS) are used in a wide variety of applications. Space weather phenomena can interfere with or damage these satellites or interfere with the radio signals with which they operate. Space weather phenomena can cause damaging surges in long-distance transmission lines and expose passengers and crew of aircraft travel to radiation, especially on polar routes.

The International Geophysical Year increased research into space weather. Ground-based data obtained during IGY demonstrated that the aurorae occurred in an auroral oval, a permanent region of luminescence 15 to 25° in latitude from the magnetic poles and 5 to 20° wide. In 1958, the Explorer I satellite discovered the Van Allen belts, regions of radiation particles trapped by the Earth's magnetic field. In January 1959, the Soviet satellite Luna 1 first directly observed the solar wind and measured its strength. A smaller International Heliophysical Year (IHY) occurred in 2007–2008.

In 1969, INJUN-5 (or Explorer 40) made the first direct observation of the electric field impressed on the Earth's high-latitude ionosphere by the solar wind. In the early 1970s, Triad data demonstrated that permanent electric currents flowed between the auroral oval and the magnetosphere.

The term "space weather" came into usage in the late 1950s as the space age began and satellites began to measure the space environment. The term regained popularity in the 1990s along with the belief that space's impact on human systems demanded a more coordinated research and application framework.

== Programs ==
=== US National Space Weather Program ===
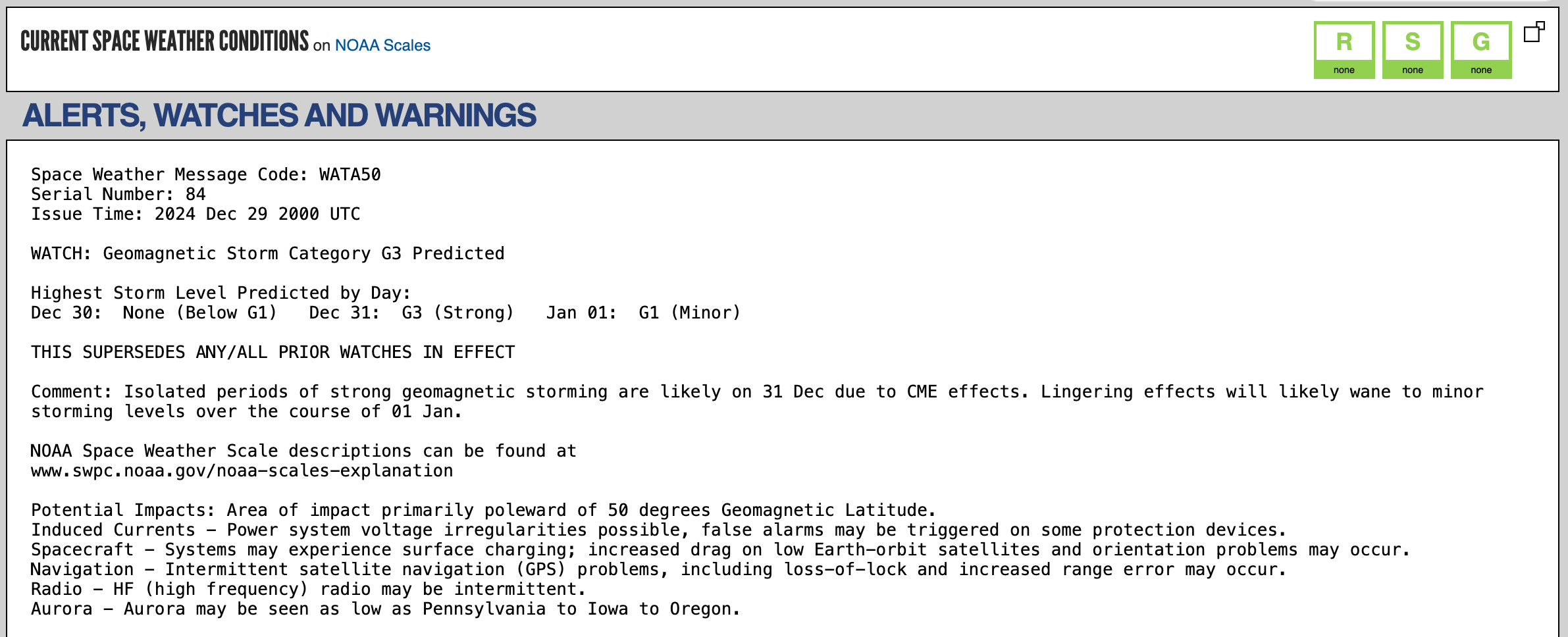
A geomagnetic storm watch issued by Space Weather Prediction Center

The purpose of the US National Space Weather Program is to focus research on the needs of the affected commercial and military communities, to connect the research and user communities, to create coordination between operational data centers, and to better define user community needs. NOAA operates the National Weather Service's Space Weather Prediction Center.

The concept was turned into an action plan in 2000, an implementation plan in 2002, an assessment in 2006 and a revised strategic plan in 2010. A revised action plan was scheduled to be released in 2011 followed by a revised implementation plan in 2012.

=== ICAO Space Weather Advisory ===
The International Civil Aviation Organization (ICAO) implemented a Space Weather Advisory program in late 2019. Under this program, ICAO designated four global space weather service providers:

- The United States, which is done by the National Oceanic and Atmospheric Administration (NOAA) Space Weather Prediction Center.
- The Australia, Canada, France, and Japan (ACFJ) consortium, comprising space weather agencies from Australia, Canada, France, and Japan.
- The Pan-European Consortium for Aviation Space Weather User Services (PECASUS), comprising space weather agencies from Finland (lead), Belgium, the United Kingdom, Poland, Germany, Netherlands, Italy, Austria, and Cyprus.
- The China-Russian Federation Consortium (CRC) comprising space weather agencies from China and the Russian Federation.

=== Government risk assessments ===
Space weather is listed as a natural hazard on risk assessments in countries such as:

- Ireland
- The United Kingdom
- New Zealand

== Phenomena ==
Within the Solar System, space weather is influenced by the solar wind and the interplanetary magnetic field carried by the solar wind plasma. A variety of physical phenomena is associated with space weather, including geomagnetic storms and substorms, energization of the Van Allen radiation belts, ionospheric disturbances and scintillation of satellite-to-ground radio signals and long-range radar signals, aurorae, and geomagnetically induced currents at Earth's surface. Coronal mass ejections are also important drivers of space weather, as they can compress the magnetosphere and trigger geomagnetic storms. Solar energetic particles (SEP) accelerated by coronal mass ejections or solar flares can trigger solar particle events, a critical driver of human impact space weather, as they can damage electronics onboard spacecraft (e.g. Galaxy 15 failure), and threaten the lives of astronauts, as well as increase radiation hazards to high-altitude, high-latitude aviation.

== Effects ==
=== Spacecraft electronics ===
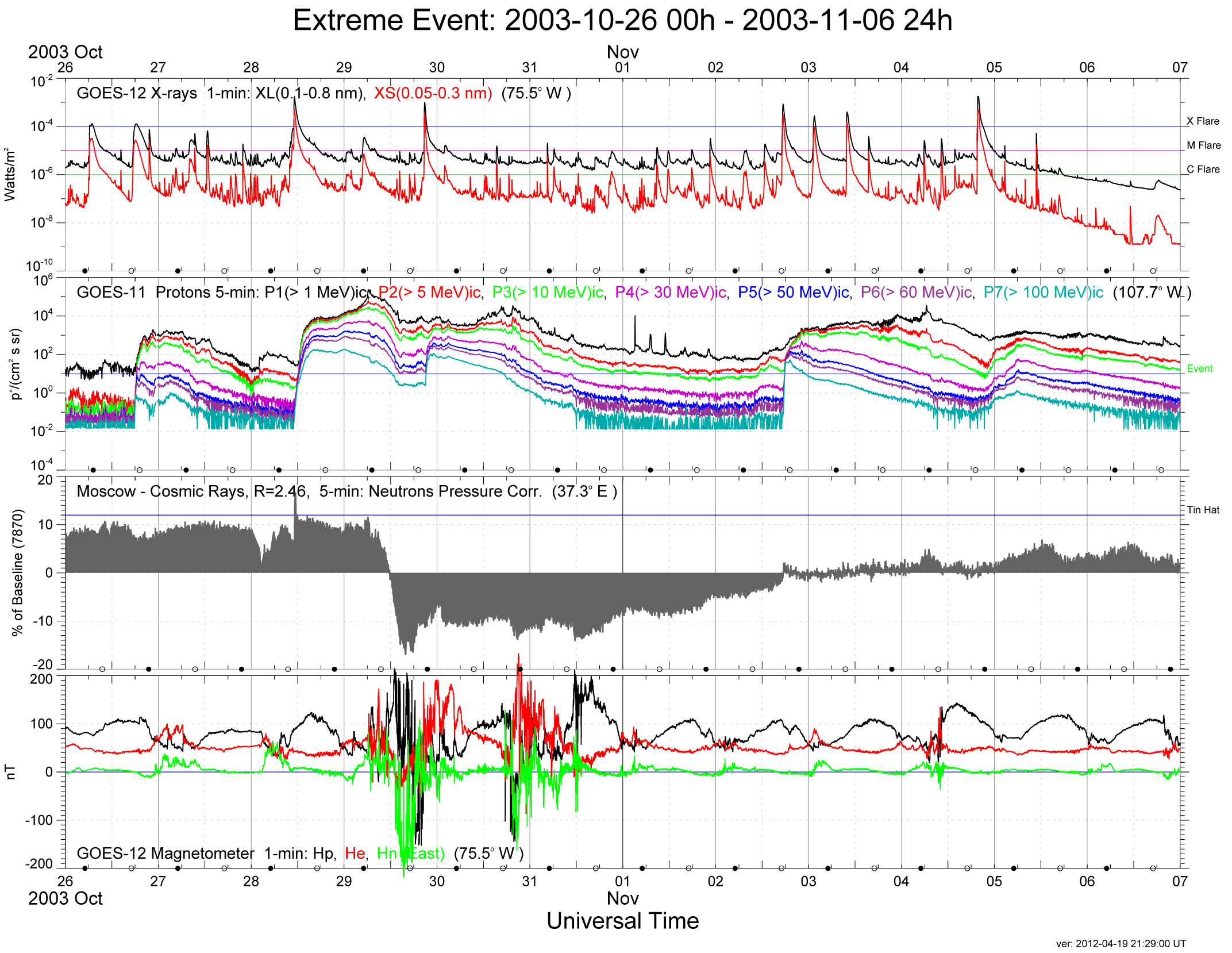
GOES-11 and GOES-12 monitored space weather conditions during the October 2003 solar activity

Some spacecraft failures can be directly attributed to space weather; many more are thought to have a space weather component. For example, 46 of the 70 failures reported in 2003 occurred during the October 2003 geomagnetic storm. The two most common adverse space weather effects on spacecraft are radiation damage and spacecraft charging.

Radiation (high-energy particles) passes through the skin of the spacecraft and into the electronic components. In most cases, the radiation causes an erroneous signal or changes one bit in memory of a spacecraft's electronics (single event upsets). In a few cases, the radiation destroys a section of the electronics (single-event latchup).

Spacecraft charging is the accumulation of an electrostatic charge on a nonconducting material on the spacecraft's surface by low-energy particles. If enough charge is built up, a discharge (spark) occurs. This can cause an erroneous signal to be detected and acted on by the spacecraft computer. A recent study indicated that spacecraft charging is the predominant space weather effect on spacecraft in geosynchronous orbit.

=== Spacecraft orbit changes ===
The orbits of spacecraft in low Earth orbit (LEO) decay to lower and lower altitudes due to the resistance from the friction between the spacecraft's surface (i.e. , drag) and the outer layer of the Earth's atmosphere (or the thermosphere and exosphere). Eventually, a LEO spacecraft falls out of orbit and towards the Earth's surface. Many spacecraft launched in the past few decades have the ability to fire a small rocket to manage their orbits. The rocket can increase altitude to extend lifetime, to direct the re-entry towards a particular (marine) site, or route the satellite to avoid collision with other spacecraft. Such maneuvers require precise information about the orbit. A geomagnetic storm can cause an orbit change over a few days that otherwise would occur over a year or more, as well as accelerate satellite re-entries from LEO. The geomagnetic storm adds heat to the thermosphere, causing the thermosphere to expand and rise, further increasing the drag on spacecraft. The 2009 satellite collision between the Iridium 33 and Cosmos 2251 demonstrated the importance of having precise knowledge of all objects in orbit. Iridium 33 had the capability to maneuver out of the path of Cosmos 2251 and could have evaded the crash, if a credible collision prediction had been available.

=== Humans in space ===
The exposure of a human body to ionizing radiation has the same harmful effects whether the source of the radiation is a medical X-ray machine, a nuclear power plant, or radiation in space. The degree of the harmful effect depends on the length of exposure and the radiation's energy density. The ever-present radiation belts extend down to the altitude of crewed spacecraft such as the International Space Station (ISS) and the Space Shuttle, but the amount of exposure is within the acceptable lifetime exposure limit under normal conditions. During a major space weather event that includes an SEP burst, the flux can increase by orders of magnitude. Areas within ISS provide shielding that can keep the total dose within safe limits. For the Space Shuttle, such an event would have required immediate mission termination.

=== Ground systems ===
==== Spacecraft signals ====
The ionosphere bends radio waves in the same manner that water in a pool bends visible light. When the medium through which such waves travel is disturbed, the light image or radio information is distorted and can become unrecognizable. The degree of distortion (scintillation) of a radio wave by the ionosphere depends on the signal frequency. Radio signals in the VHF band (30 to 300 MHz) can be distorted beyond recognition by a disturbed ionosphere. Radio signals in the UHF band (300 MHz to 3 GHz) transit a disturbed ionosphere, but a receiver may not be able to keep locked to the carrier frequency. GPS uses signals at 1575.42 MHz (L1) and 1227.6 MHz (L2) that can be distorted by a disturbed ionosphere. Space weather events that corrupt GPS signals can significantly impact society. For example, the Wide Area Augmentation System operated by the US Federal Aviation Administration (FAA) is used as a navigation tool for North American commercial aviation. It is disabled by every major space weather event. Outages can range from minutes to days. Major space weather events can push the disturbed polar ionosphere 10° to 30° of latitude toward the equator and can cause large ionospheric gradients (changes in density over distance of hundreds of km) at mid and low latitude. Both of these factors can distort GPS signals.

=== Long-distance radio signals ===
Radio waves in the HF band (3 to 30 MHz) (also known as the shortwave band) are reflected by the ionosphere. Since the ground also reflects HF waves, a signal can be transmitted around the curvature of the Earth beyond the line of sight. During the 20th century, HF communications was the only method for a ship or aircraft far from land or a base station to communicate. The advent of systems such as Iridium brought other methods of communications, but HF remains critical for vessels that do not carry the newer equipment and as a critical backup system for others. Space weather events can create irregularities in the ionosphere that scatter HF signals instead of reflecting them, preventing HF communications. At auroral and polar latitudes, small space weather events that occur frequently disrupt HF communications. At mid-latitudes, HF communications are disrupted by solar radio bursts, by X-rays from solar flares (which enhance and disturb the ionospheric D-layer) and by TEC enhancements and irregularities during major geomagnetic storms.

Transpolar airline routes are particularly sensitive to space weather, in part because Federal Aviation Regulations require reliable communication over the entire flight. Diverting such a flight is estimated to cost about $100,000.

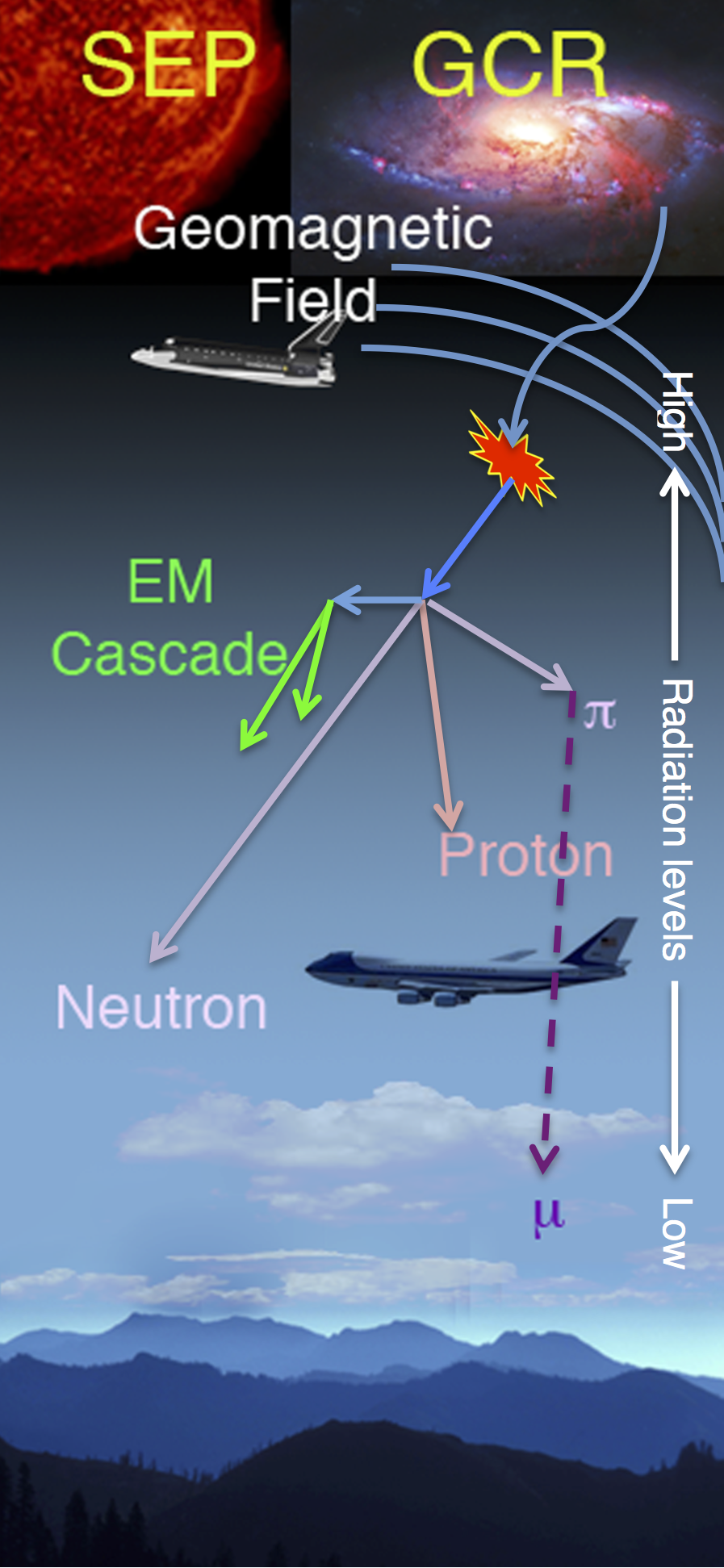
All passengers in commercial aircraft flying above 26,000 feet (7,900 m) typically experience some exposure in this aviation radiation environment.

=== Humans in commercial aviation ===
The magnetosphere guides cosmic ray and solar energetic particles to polar latitudes, while high-energy charged particles enter the mesosphere, stratosphere, and troposphere. These energetic particles at the top of the atmosphere shatter atmospheric atoms and molecules, creating harmful lower-energy particles that penetrate deep into the atmosphere and create measurable radiation. All aircraft flying above 8 km (26,200 feet) altitude are exposed to these particles. The dose exposure is greater in polar regions than at midlatitude and equatorial regions. Many commercial aircraft fly over the polar region. When a space weather event causes radiation exposure to exceed the safe level set by aviation authorities, the aircraft's flight path is diverted.

Measurements of the radiation environment at commercial aircraft altitudes above 8 km (26,000 ft) have historically been done by instruments that record the data on board where the data are then processed later on the ground. However, a system of real-time radiation measurements on-board aircraft has been developed through the NASA Automated Radiation Measurements for Aerospace Safety (ARMAS) program. ARMAS has flown hundreds of flights since 2013, mostly on research aircraft, and sent the data to the ground through Iridium satellite links. The eventual goal of these types of measurements is to data assimilate them into physics-based global radiation models, e.g., NASA's Nowcast of Atmospheric Ionizing Radiation System (NAIRAS), so as to provide the weather of the radiation environment rather than the climatology.

=== Ground-induced electric fields ===
Magnetic storm activity can induce geoelectric fields in the Earth's conducting lithosphere. Corresponding voltage differentials can find their way into electric power grids through ground connections, driving uncontrolled electric currents that interfere with grid operation, damage transformers, trip protective relays, and sometimes cause blackouts. This complicated chain of causes and effects was demonstrated during the magnetic storm of March 1989, which caused the complete collapse of the Hydro-Québec electric-power grid in Canada, temporarily leaving nine million people without electricity. The possible occurrence of an even more intense storm led to operational standards intended to mitigate induction-hazard risks, while reinsurance companies commissioned revised risk assessments.

=== Geophysical exploration ===
Air- and ship-borne magnetic surveys can be affected by rapid magnetic field variations during geomagnetic storms. Such storms cause data-interpretation problems because the space weather-related magnetic field changes are similar in magnitude to those of the subsurface crustal magnetic field in the survey area. Accurate geomagnetic storm warnings, including an assessment of storm magnitude and duration, allows for an economic use of survey equipment.

=== Geophysics and hydrocarbon production ===
For economic and other reasons, oil and gas production often involves horizontal drilling of well paths many kilometers from a single wellhead. Accuracy requirements are strict, due to target size – reservoirs may only be a few tens to hundreds of meters across – and safety, because of the proximity of other boreholes. The most accurate gyroscopic method is expensive, since it can stop drilling for hours. An alternative is to use a magnetic survey, which enables measurement while drilling (MWD). Near real-time magnetic data can be used to correct drilling direction. Magnetic data and space weather forecasts can help to clarify unknown sources of drilling error.

=== Terrestrial weather ===
The amount of energy entering the troposphere and stratosphere from space weather phenomena is trivial compared to the solar insolation in the visible and infrared portions of the solar electromagnetic spectrum. Although some linkage between the 11-year sunspot cycle and the Earth's climate has been claimed., this has never been verified. For example, the Maunder minimum, a 70-year period almost devoid of sunspots, has often been suggested to be correlated to a cooler climate, but these correlations have disappeared after deeper studies. The suggested link from changes in cosmic-ray flux causing changes in the amount of cloud formation did not survive scientific tests. Another suggestion, that variations in the extreme ultraviolet (EUV) flux subtly influence existing drivers of the climate and tip the balance between El Niño/La Niña events collapsed when new research showed this was not possible. As such, a linkage between space weather and the climate has not been demonstrated.

In addition, a link has been suggested between high energy charged particles (such as SEPs and cosmic rays) and cloud formation. This is because charged particles interact with the atmosphere to produce volatiles which then condense, creating cloud seeds. This is a topic of ongoing research at CERN, where experiments test the effect of high-energy charged particles on atmosphere. If proven, this may suggest a link between space weather (in the form of solar particle events) and cloud formation.

Most recently, a statistical connection has been reported between the occurrence of heavy floods and the arrivals of high-speed solar wind streams (HSSs). The enhanced auroral energy deposition during HSSs is suggested as a mechanism for the generation of downward propagating atmospheric gravity waves (AGWs). As AGWs reach lower atmosphere, they may excite the conditional instability in the troposphere, thus leading to excessive rainfall.

== Observation ==
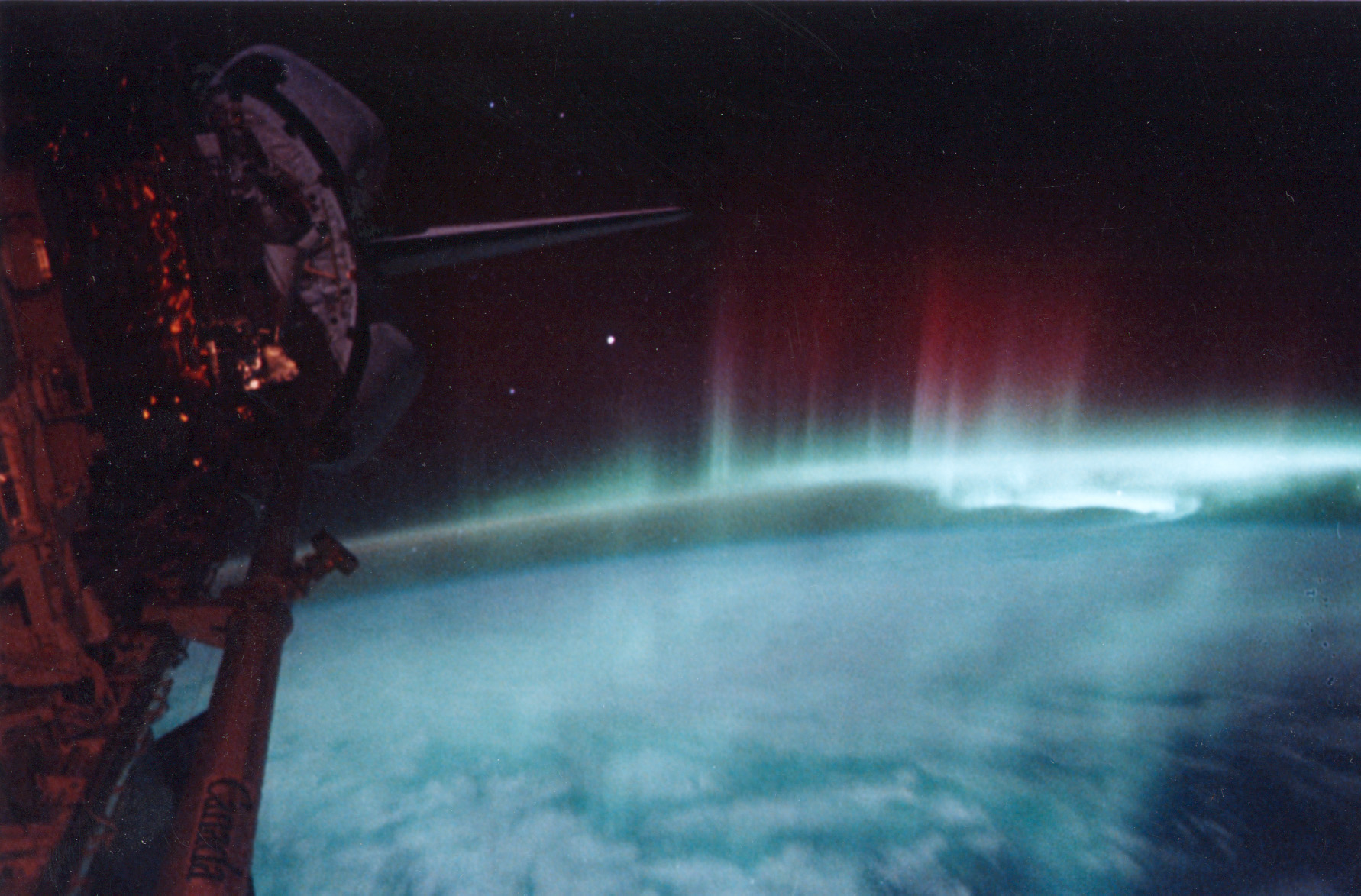
Aurora australis observed from Space Shuttle Discovery, May 1991

Observation of space weather is done both for scientific research and applications. Scientific observation has evolved with the state of knowledge, while application-related observation expanded with the ability to exploit such data.

=== Ground-based ===
Space weather is monitored at ground level by observing changes in the Earth's magnetic field over periods of seconds to days, by observing the surface of the Sun, and by observing radio noise created in the Sun's atmosphere.

The Sunspot Number (SSN) is the number of sunspots on the Sun's photosphere in visible light on the side of the Sun visible to an Earth observer. The number and total area of sunspots are related to the brightness of the Sun in the EUV and X-ray portions of the solar spectrum and to solar activity such as solar flares and coronal mass ejections.

The 10.7 cm radio flux (F10.7) is a measurement of RF emissions from the Sun and is roughly correlated with the solar EUV flux. Since this RF emission is easily obtained from the ground and EUV flux is not, this value has been measured and disseminated continuously since 1947. The world standard measurements are made by the Dominion Radio Astrophysical Observatory at Penticton, BC, Canada and reported once a day at local noon in solar flux units (10^{−22}W·m^{−2}·Hz^{−1}). F10.7 is archived by the National Geophysical Data Center.

Fundamental space weather monitoring data are provided by ground-based magnetometers and magnetic observatories. Magnetic storms were first discovered by ground-based measurement of occasional magnetic disturbance. Ground magnetometer data provide real-time situational awareness for postevent analysis. Magnetic observatories have been in continuous operations for decades to centuries, providing data to inform studies of long-term changes in space climatology.

Disturbance storm time index (Dst index) is an estimate of the magnetic field change at the Earth's magnetic equator due to a ring of electric current at and just earthward of the geosynchronous orbit. The index is based on data from four ground-based magnetic observatories between 21° and 33° magnetic latitude during a one-hour period. Stations closer to the magnetic equator are not used due to ionospheric effects. The Dst index is compiled and archived by the World Data Center for Geomagnetism, Kyoto.

Kp/ap index: 'a' is an index created from the geomagnetic disturbance at one midlatitude (40° to 50° latitude) geomagnetic observatory during a 3-hour period. 'K' is the quasilogarithmic counterpart of the 'a' index. Kp and ap are the average of K and an over 13 geomagnetic observatories to represent planetary-wide geomagnetic disturbances. The Kp/ap index indicates both geomagnetic storms and substorms (auroral disturbance). Kp/ap data are available from 1932 onward.

AE index is compiled from geomagnetic disturbances at 12 geomagnetic observatories in and near the auroral zones and is recorded at 1-minute intervals. The public AE index is available with a lag of two to three days that limits its utility for space weather applications. The AE index indicates the intensity of geomagnetic substorms except during a major geomagnetic storm when the auroral zones expand equatorward from the observatories.

Radio noise bursts are reported by the Radio Solar Telescope Network to the U.S. Air Force and to NOAA. The radio bursts are associated with solar flare plasma that interacts with the ambient solar atmosphere.

The Sun's photosphere is observed continuously for activity that can be the precursors to solar flares and CMEs. The Global Oscillation Network Group (GONG) project monitors both the surface and the interior of the Sun by using helioseismology, the study of sound waves propagating through the Sun and observed as ripples on the solar surface. GONG can detect sunspot groups on the far side of the Sun. This ability has recently been verified by visual observations from the STEREO spacecraft.

Neutron monitors on the ground indirectly monitor cosmic rays from the Sun and galactic sources. When cosmic rays interact with the atmosphere, atomic interactions occur that cause a shower of lower-energy particles to descend into the atmosphere and to ground level. The presence of cosmic rays in the near-Earth space environment can be detected by monitoring high-energy neutrons at ground level. Small fluxes of cosmic rays are present continuously. Large fluxes are produced by the Sun during events related to energetic solar flares.

Total Electron Content (TEC) is a measure of the ionosphere over a given location. TEC is the number of electrons in a column one meter square from the base of the ionosphere (around 90 km altitude) to the top of the ionosphere (around 1000 km altitude). Many TEC measurements are made by monitoring the two frequencies transmitted by GPS spacecraft. Presently, GPS TEC is monitored and distributed in real time from more than 360 stations maintained by agencies in many countries.

Geoeffectiveness is a measure of how strongly space weather magnetic fields, such as coronal mass ejections, couple with the Earth's magnetic field. This is determined by the direction of the magnetic field held within the plasma that originates from the Sun. New techniques measuring Faraday rotation in radio waves are in development to measure field direction.

=== Satellite-based ===
A host of research spacecraft have explored space weather. The Orbiting Geophysical Observatory series were among the first spacecraft with the mission of analyzing the space environment. Recent spacecraft include the NASA-ESA Solar-Terrestrial Relations Observatory (STEREO) pair of spacecraft launched in 2006 into solar orbit and the Van Allen Probes, launched in 2012 into a highly elliptical Earth orbit. The two STEREO spacecraft drift away from the Earth by about 22° per year, one leading and the other trailing the Earth in its orbit. Together they compile information about the solar surface and atmosphere in three dimensions. The Van Allen probes record detailed information about the radiation belts, geomagnetic storms, and the relationship between the two.

Some spacecraft with other primary missions have carried auxiliary instruments for solar observation. Among the earliest such spacecraft were the Applications Technology Satellite (ATS) series at GEO that were precursors to the modern Geostationary Operational Environmental Satellite (GOES) weather satellite and many communication satellites. The ATS spacecraft carried environmental particle sensors as auxiliary payloads and had their navigational magnetic field sensor used for sensing the environment.

Many of the early instruments were research spacecraft that were re-purposed for space weather applications. One of the first of these was the IMP-8 (Interplanetary Monitoring Platform). It orbited the Earth at 35 Earth radii and observed the solar wind for two-thirds of its 12-day orbits from 1973 to 2006. Since the solar wind carries disturbances that affect the magnetosphere and ionosphere, IMP-8 demonstrated the utility of continuous solar wind monitoring. IMP-8 was followed by ISEE-3, which was placed near the L_{1} Sun-Earth Lagrangian point, 235 Earth radii above the surface (about 1.5 million km, or 924,000 miles) and continuously monitored the solar wind from 1978 to 1982. The next spacecraft to monitor the solar wind at the L_{1} point was WIND from 1994 to 1998. After April 1998, the WIND spacecraft orbit was changed to circle the Earth and occasionally pass the L_{1} point. The NASA Advanced Composition Explorer has monitored the solar wind at the L_{1} point from 1997 to present.

In addition to monitoring the solar wind, monitoring the Sun is important to space weather. Because the solar EUV cannot be monitored from the ground, the joint NASA-ESA Solar and Heliospheric Observatory (SOHO) spacecraft was launched and has provided solar EUV images beginning in 1995. SOHO is a main source of near-real time solar data for both research and space weather prediction and inspired the STEREO mission. The Yohkoh spacecraft at LEO observed the Sun from 1991 to 2001 in the X-ray portion of the solar spectrum and was useful for both research and space weather prediction. Data from Yohkoh inspired the Solar X-ray Imager on GOES.

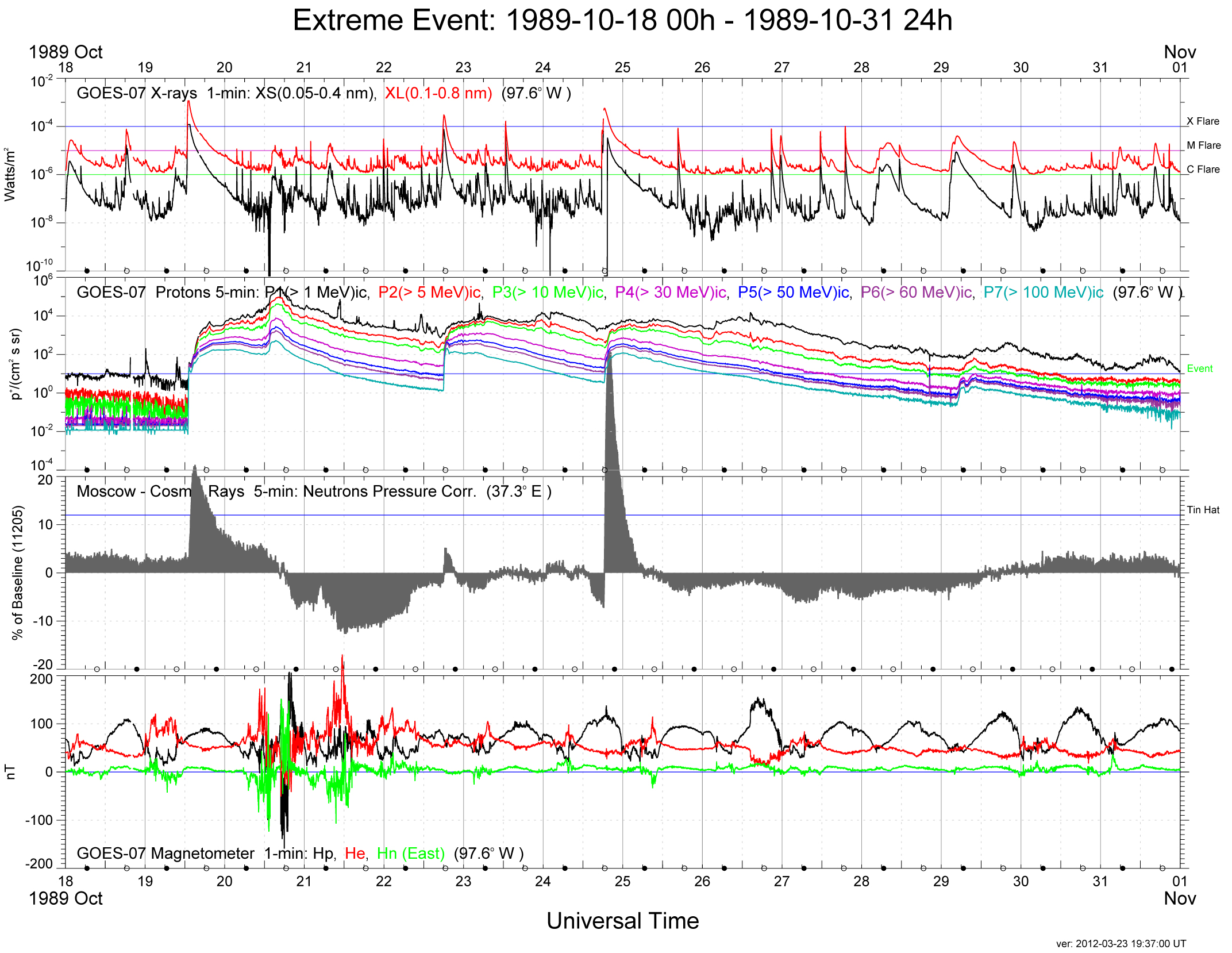
GOES-7 monitors space weather conditions during the October 1989 solar activity resulted in a Forbush Decrease, ground level enhancements, and many satellite anomalies.

Spacecraft with instruments whose primary purpose is to provide data for space weather predictions and applications include the Geostationary Operational Environmental Satellite (GOES) series of spacecraft, the POES series, the DMSP series, and the Meteosat series. The GOES spacecraft have carried an X-ray sensor (XRS) which measures the flux from the whole solar disk in two bands – 0.05 to 0.4 nm and 0.1 to 0.8 nm – since 1974, an X-ray imager (SXI) since 2004, a magnetometer which measures the distortions of the Earth's magnetic field due to space weather, a whole disk EUV sensor since 2004, and particle sensors (EPS/HEPAD) which measure ions and electrons in the energy range of 50 keV to 500 MeV. Starting sometime after 2015, the GOES-R generation of GOES spacecraft will replace the SXI with a solar EUV image (SUVI) similar to the one on SOHO and STEREO and the particle sensor will be augmented with a component to extend the energy range down to 30 eV.

The Deep Space Climate Observatory (DSCOVR) satellite is a NOAA Earth observation and space weather satellite that launched in February 2015. Among its features is advance warning of coronal mass ejections.

== Models ==
Space weather models are simulations of the space weather environment. Models use sets of mathematical equations to describe physical processes.

These models take a limited data set and attempt to describe all or part of the space weather environment in or to predict how weather evolves over time. Early models were heuristic; i.e., they did not directly employ physics. These models take less resources than their more sophisticated descendants.

Later models use physics to account for as many phenomena as possible. No model can yet reliably predict the environment from the surface of the Sun to the bottom of the Earth's ionosphere. Space weather models differ from meteorological models in that the amount of input is vastly smaller.

A significant portion of space weather model research and development in the past two decades has been done as part of the Geospace Environmental Model (GEM) program of the National Science Foundation. The two major modeling centers are the Center for Space Environment Modeling (CSEM) and the Center for Integrated Space weather Modeling (CISM). The Community Coordinated Modeling Center (CCMC) at the NASA Goddard Space Flight Center is a facility for coordinating the development and testing of research models, for improving and preparing models for use in space weather prediction and application.

Modeling techniques include (a) magnetohydrodynamics, in which the environment is treated as a fluid, (b) particle in cell, in which non-fluid interactions are handled within a cell and then cells are connected to describe the environment, (c) first principles, in which physical processes are in balance (or equilibrium) with one another, (d) semi-static modeling, in which a statistical or empirical relationship is described, or a combination of multiple methods.

== Commercial space weather development ==
During the first decade of the 21st Century, a commercial sector emerged that engaged in space weather, serving agency, academia, commercial and consumer sectors. Space weather providers are typically smaller companies, or small divisions within a larger company, that provide space weather data, models, derivative products and service distribution.

The commercial sector includes scientific and engineering researchers as well as users. Activities are primarily directed toward the impacts of space weather upon technology. These include, for example:

- Atmospheric drag on LEO satellites caused by energy inputs into the thermosphere from solar UV, FUV, Lyman-alpha, EUV, XUV, X-ray, and gamma ray photons as well as by charged particle precipitation and Joule heating at high latitudes;
- Surface and internal charging from increased energetic particle fluxes, leading to effects such as discharges, single event upsets and latch-up, on LEO to GEO satellites;
- Disrupted GPS signals caused by ionospheric scintillation leading to increased uncertainty in navigation systems such as aviation's Wide Area Augmentation System (WAAS);
- Lost HF, UHF and L-band radio communications due to ionosphere scintillation, solar flares and geomagnetic storms;
- Increased radiation to human tissue and avionics from galactic cosmic rays SEP, especially during large solar flares, and possibly bremsstrahlung gamma-rays produced by precipitating radiation belt energetic electrons at altitudes above 8 km;
- Increased inaccuracy in surveying and oil/gas exploration that uses the Earth's main magnetic field when it is disturbed by geomagnetic storms;
- Loss of power transmission from GIC surges in the electrical power grid and transformer shutdowns during large geomagnetic storms.

Many of these disturbances result in societal impacts that account for a significant part of the national GDP.

The concept of incentivizing commercial space weather was first suggested by the idea of a Space Weather Economic Innovation Zone discussed by the American Commercial Space Weather Association (ACSWA) in 2015. The establishment of this economic innovation zone would encourage expanded economic activity developing applications to manage the risks space weather and would encourage broader research activities related to space weather by universities. It could encourage U.S. business investment in space weather services and products. It promoted the support of U.S. business innovation in space weather services and products by requiring U.S. government purchases of U.S. built commercial hardware, software, and associated products and services where no suitable government capability pre-exists. It also promoted U.S. built commercial hardware, software, and associated products and services sales to international partners. designate U.S. built commercial hardware, services, and products as "Space Weather Economic Innovation Zone" activities; Finally, it recommended that U.S. built commercial hardware, services, and products be tracked as Space Weather Economic Innovation Zone contributions within agency reports. In 2015 the U.S. Congress bill HR1561 provided groundwork where social and environmental impacts from a Space Weather Economic Innovation Zone could be far-reaching. In 2016, the Space Weather Research and Forecasting Act (S. 2817) was introduced to build on that legacy. Later, in 2017-2018 the HR3086 Bill took these concepts, included the breadth of material from parallel agency studies as part of the OSTP-sponsored Space Weather Action Program (SWAP), and with bicameral and bipartisan support the 116th Congress (2019) is considering passage of the Space Weather Coordination Act (S141, 115th Congress).

== Notable events ==
- On December 21, 1806, Alexander von Humboldt observed that his compass had become erratic during a bright auroral event.
- The Solar storm of 1859 (Carrington Event) caused widespread disruption of telegraph service.
- The Aurora of November 17, 1882 disrupted telegraph service.
- The May 1921 geomagnetic storm, one of the largest geomagnetic storms disrupted telegraph service and damaged electrical equipment worldwide.
- The Solar storm of August 1972, a large SEP event occurred. If astronauts had been in space at the time, the dose could have been life-threatening.
- The March 1989 geomagnetic storm included multiple space weather effects: SEP, CME, Forbush decrease, ground level enhancement, geomagnetic storm, etc.
- The 2000 Bastille Day event coincided with exceptionally bright aurora.
- April 21, 2002, the Nozomi Mars Probe was hit by a large SEP event that caused large-scale failure. The mission, which was already about 3 years behind schedule, was abandoned in December 2003.
- The 2003 Halloween solar storms, a series of coronal mass ejections and solar flares in late October and early November 2003 with associated impacts.

== See also ==
- Atmospheric physics
- Atmospheric science
- Earth's magnetic field
- Exometeorology
- Heliosphere
- Magnetic cloud
- Magnetosheath
- Meteorology
- Plasma physics
- Upper-atmospheric lightning
- Receiver Autonomous Integrity Monitoring
- Solar physics
- Space climate
- Space hurricane
- Space tornado
- Space exploration
- Space radiation
- Space weathering
- Sudden ionospheric disturbance

== General bibliography ==
- Daglis, Ioannis A.: Effects of Space Weather on Technology Infrastructure. Springer, Dordrecht 2005, ISBN 1-4020-2748-6.
- Lilensten, Jean, and Jean Bornarel, Space Weather, Environment and Societies, Springer, ISBN 978-1-4020-4331-4.
- Moldwin, Mark: An Introduction to Space Weather. Cambridge Univ. Press, Cambridge 2008, ISBN 978-0-521-86149-6.
- Schwenn, Rainer, Space Weather, Living Reviews in Solar Physics 3, (2006), 2, online article.
