= Community Coordinated Modeling Center =

Community organization

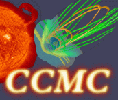

The Community Coordinated Modeling Center (CCMC) is a collaborative effort between multiple organizations in the United States to provide information and models relating to space weather research. The partnership includes resources from NASA, the Air Force Materiel Command, Air Force Research Laboratory (AFRL), Air Force Weather Agency (AFWA), NOAA, NSF, and ONR. Quoted from the site's main page, the CCMC is "a multi-agency partnership to enable, support and perform the research and development for next generation space science and space weather models." The CCMC is based at the NASA Goddard Space Flight Center in Greenbelt, Maryland.
