= Space hurricane =

Solar windstorm

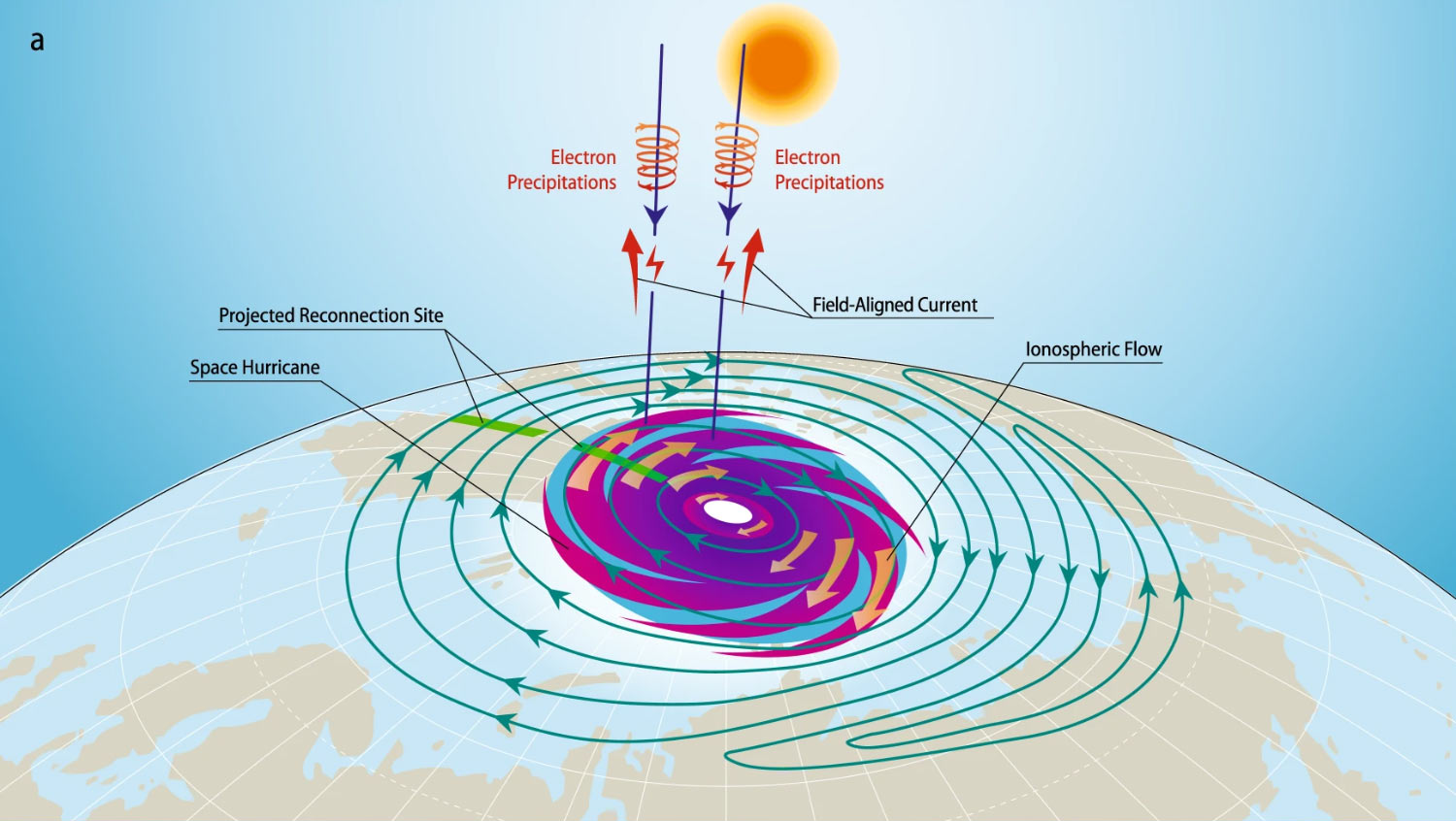
Diagram of a space hurricane over the Earth's Arctic region

A space hurricane is a huge, funnel-like, spiral geomagnetic storm that occurs above the polar Ionosphere of Earth, during extremely quiet conditions. They are related to the aurora borealis phenomenon, as the electron precipitation from the storm's funnel produces gigantic, cyclone-shaped auroras. Scientists believe that they occur in the polar regions of planets with magnetic fields.

Hurricanes (tropical cyclones) on Earth are formed within the atmosphere by thunderstorms and angular momentum from the Earth's rotation, and draw up energy from the ocean surface, while space hurricanes are formed by plasma interacting with magnetic fields and draw energy down from the flow of the solar wind.

== Characteristics ==
Space hurricanes are made up of plasmas, consisting of extremely hot ionized gases that rotate at extremely high speeds, with rotational speeds reaching up to 7,560 kilometres per hour (4,700 mph). In 2020, using observations that had been made on 20 August 2014, researchers identified a large space hurricane that had occurred over the Arctic, spanning 1,000 kilometres (620 mi) in diameter at its base in the Ionosphere, the ionized upper upper atmosphere at an altitude of 110–860 kilometres (68–534 mi), and roughly centered over the North Magnetic Pole.

The space hurricane was characterized by a cyclone-like auroral spot with multiple spiral arms, due to precipitating electrons, strong circular plasma vorticity with zero horizontal flow at its center (the equivalent of the eye of an atmospheric hurricane), a negative-to-positive bipolar magnetic structure (showing a circular magnetic field perturbation), and a large and rapid deposition of energy and flux into the polar ionosphere (comparable to that during space weather superstorms). The storm extended from the Ionosphere upward along geomagnetic field lines to cover a large fraction of the dayside polar magnetosphere, in the Northern Hemisphere.

Additionally, the space hurricane had multiple spiral arms, similar to conventional hurricanes, and the storm also rotated in a counterclockwise direction. The large plasma storm rained electrons instead of water. In the calm central region, encircled by the rotating plasma, there was a persistent auroral spot, associated with a strong, upward, field-aligned current caused by precipitating electrons. The electron rain produced a gigantic, cyclone-shaped aurora below the storm.

Unlike conventional space weather disturbances, the space hurricane was observed during very quiet geomagnetic conditions, when the flow of the solar wind was slow and the interplanetary magnetic field was pointing northward, whereas a strongly southward orientation is needed to drive conventional geomagnetic storms. This provides a further analogy to hurricanes in the lower atmosphere: an Accuweather meteorologist noted that hurricanes needed light winds aloft in order to form.

== Effects ==
Researchers indicated that the electron precipitation associated with the storm could disrupt GPS satellites, radio systems, and radar, and could also increase the drag on any nearby satellites, as well as changing the orbits of space debris ("space junk") of all sizes at low altitudes, which are an increasing hazard for spacecraft in low Earth orbit. However, aside from these potential space weather impacts, the storm is expected to have little impacts on the planet.

== Discovery ==
The phenomenon was discovered by a team of researchers from Shandong University in China, whom had observed the storm over the Arctic region on 20 August 2014, before identifying its nature in 2021. The research team also consisted of scientists from the United States, the United Kingdom, and Norway. The team observed the space hurricane for 8 hours, before it gradually broke down. The storm was observed during a period of low solar and geomagnetic activity. This was the first time that a hurricane-like storm had been observed in the upper atmosphere, and previously, it was uncertain whether they existed. Researchers believe that such space storms may be relatively common in the Solar System and beyond, on planets with magnetic fields, because the storm observed in 2014 occurred during a period of low geomagnetic activity.

== See also ==
- Space tornado
- Space weather
- Earth's magnetic field
- Solar wind
