= Space tornado =

Solar windstorm

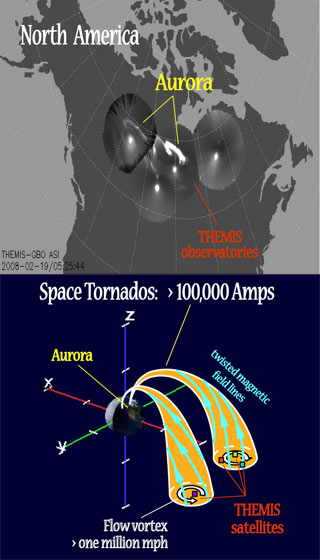
In April 2009, THEMIS satellites helped examine how space tornadoes create the aurora phenomena.

A space tornado is a solar windstorm and is exceptionally larger and more powerful than conventional tornadoes on Earth. They are also thought to produce the aurora borealis phenomenon.

Tornadoes on Earth are formed within the atmosphere by thunderstorms, while space tornadoes are formed by plasma interacting with magnetic fields.

== Characteristics ==
Space tornadoes are made up of plasmas, consisting of extremely hot ionized gases that rotate at extremely high speeds, some recorded at over 1,000,000 miles per hour (1,600,000 km/h). Within its funnel, they also generate strong electrical currents of about 100,000 amperes. Observations show some reach up to 9,300 miles (15,000 km) in size then will produce miniature space tornadoes stretching around 60 to 90 miles (97 to 145 km) wide and more than 125 miles (201 km) long. Space tornadoes form roughly every three hours and take only a minute to reach the ionosphere. Power transformers and other man-made constructs are susceptible to damage from space tornadoes.

== Discovery ==
Much of what is understood about space tornadoes was obtained through a NASA mission called Time History of Events and Macroscale Interactions during Substorms (THEMIS), which deployed several probes to measure the strength of the electrical currents, size, and velocity of the rotating plasma.

== See also ==
- Space hurricane
- Earth's magnetic field
- Solar wind
