= Spacecraft charging =

Buildup of electric charge on spacecraft

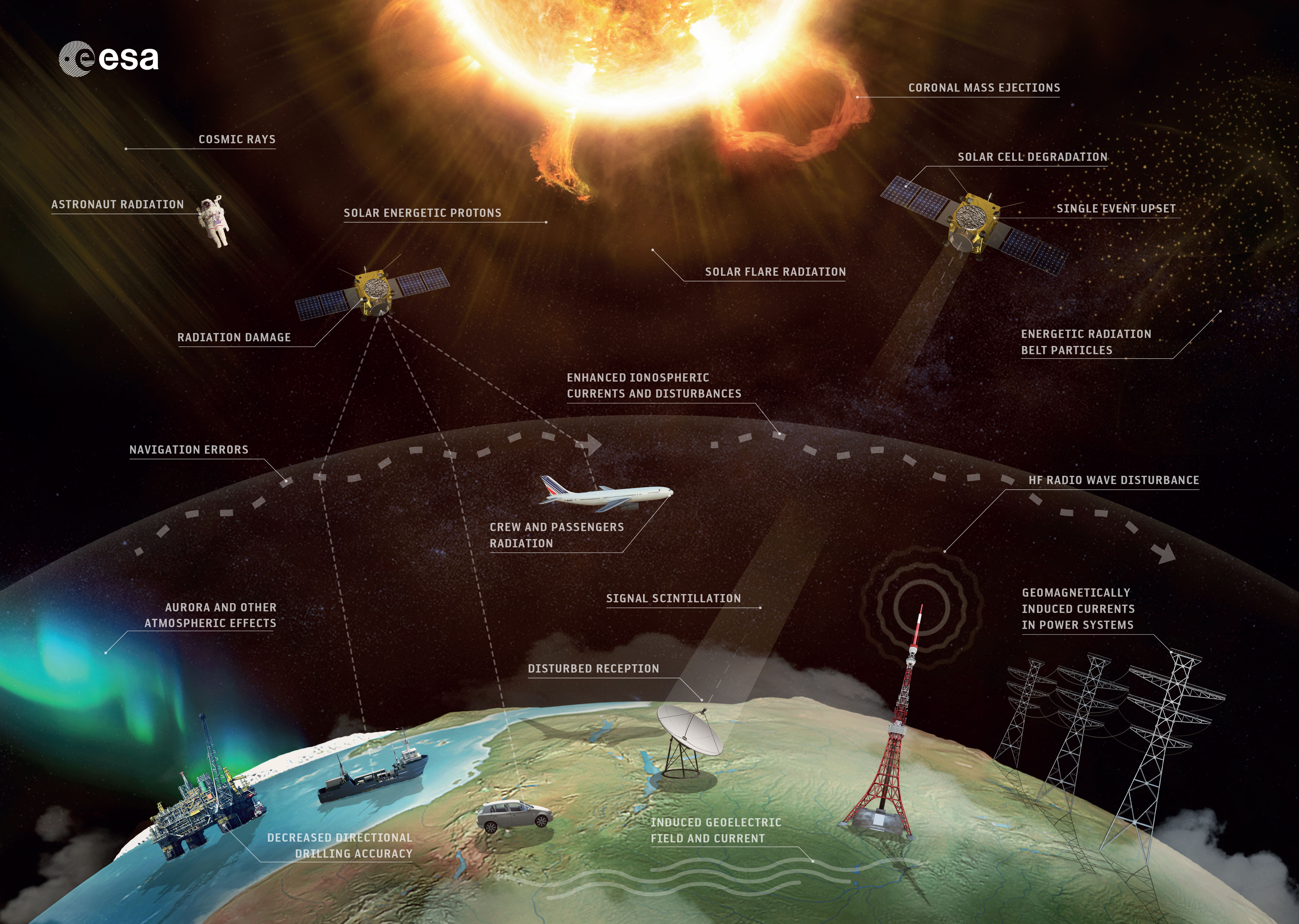
Space weather effects

Spacecraft charging is a physical phenomenon where spacecraft accumulate electrical charge while operating in space environments. This effect occurs due to interactions between the spacecraft and the surrounding plasma environment, solar radiation, and cosmic rays.

== Mechanisms ==
Spacecraft charging develops through several mechanisms:

- Photoelectric emission. When sunlight strikes spacecraft surfaces, electrons are ejected, creating a positive charge.
- Plasma interactions. Ambient space plasma particles (electrons and ions) impact and collect on spacecraft surfaces.
- Secondary electron emission. When high-energy particles strike spacecraft surfaces, they can release additional electrons.
- Deep dielectric charging. High-energy particles penetrate and become trapped within spacecraft materials.

The charging process varies significantly by orbit. Geosynchronous orbits experience severe charging during geomagnetic storms, while low Earth orbits face charging in polar regions and during night passages.

== Effects and hazards ==
Spacecraft charging poses several operational threats:

- Electrostatic discharges (ESDs). Arc discharges that can damage electronics, sensors, and thermal control coatings.
- False commands. Discharge-induced electromagnetic signals that can trigger unintended system operations.
- Material degradation. Surface damage affects thermal properties and solar array efficiency.
- Scientific interference. Charged surfaces can distort measurements from plasma instruments.

== Incidents ==
Incidents caused by spacecraft charging include the 2010 Galaxy 15 communications satellite failure, which drifted uncontrolled for eight months after a charging event disrupted its command systems, and the complete loss of the ADEOS II satellite in 2003.

== Mitigation ==
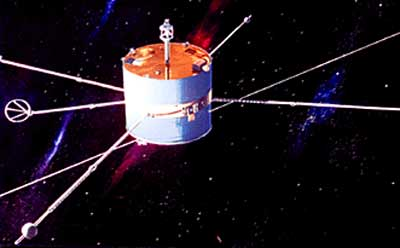
SCATHA spacecraft

Several spacecraft were launched to understand the causes and effects of charging. SCATHA (Spacecraft Charging AT High Altitudes) was launched by the United States Air Force in 1979, and "proved to be a boon to the space-science and satellite-engineering communities". The spacecraft experienced arcs, and measured "both the space environment and the charging of the whole satellite and several of its surfaces in response to it". Several satellites were developed by the Los Alamos National Laboratory; others include the Geostationary Operational Environmental Satellites (GOES).

Several approaches were developed to minimize charging risks:

- Usage of conductive coatings can distribute charge evenly across spacecraft surfaces.
- Grounding schemes provide discharge paths to prevent differential charging.
- Active charge control emit charged particles to neutralize spacecraft potential.

Modern spacecraft design increasingly relies on comprehensive modeling to prevent charging anomalies during mission operations.
