= Dipole model of Earth's magnetic field =

Simple approximation of Earth's magnetic field

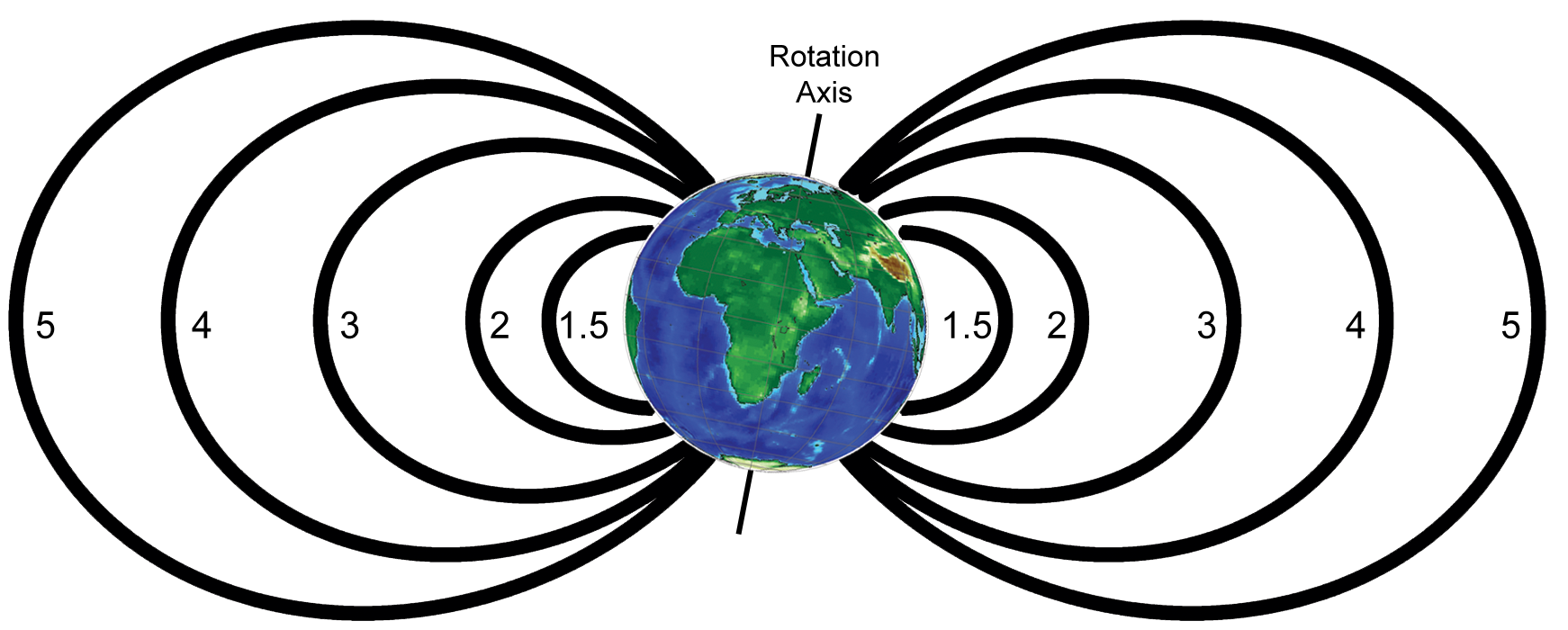
Plot showing field lines (which, in three dimensions would describe "shells") for L-values 1.5, 2, 3, 4 and 5 using a dipole model of Earth's magnetic field

The dipole model of Earth's magnetic field is a first order approximation of the rather complex true Earth's magnetic field. Due to effects of the interplanetary magnetic field (IMF), and the solar wind, the dipole model is particularly inaccurate at high L-shells (e.g., above L=3), but may be a good approximation for lower L-shells. For more precise work, or for any work at higher L-shells, a more accurate model that incorporates solar effects, such as the Tsyganenko magnetic field model, is recommended.

== Formulation ==
The following equations describe the dipole magnetic field.

First, define $B_0$ as the mean value of the magnetic field at the magnetic equator on Earth's surface. Typically $B_0=3.12\times10^{-5}\ \textrm{T}$.

Then, the radial and latitudinal fields can be described as

$$B_r = -2B_0\left(\frac{R_E}{r}\right)^3\cos\theta$$

$$B_\theta = -B_0\left(\frac{R_E}{r}\right)^3\sin\theta$$

$$|B| = B_0\left(\frac{R_E}{r}\right)^3 \sqrt{1 + 3\cos^2\theta}$$

where $R_E$ is the mean radius of Earth (approximately 6370 km), $r$ is the radial distance from the center of Earth (using the same units as used for $R_E$), and $\theta$ is the colatitude measured from the north magnetic pole (or geomagnetic pole).

== Alternative formulation ==
Magnetic field components vs. latitude

It is sometimes more convenient to express the magnetic field in terms of magnetic latitude and distance in Earth radii. The magnetic latitude (MLAT), or geomagnetic latitude, $\lambda$ is measured northwards from the equator (analogous to geographic latitude) and is related to the colatitude $\theta$ by

$$\lambda = \pi/2 - \theta$$.

In this case, the radial and latitudinal components of the magnetic field (the latter still in the $\theta$ direction, measured from the axis of the north pole) are given by

$$B_r = -\frac{2B_0}{R^3}\sin\lambda$$

$$B_\theta = \frac{B_0}{R^3}\cos\lambda$$

$$|B| = \frac{B_0}{R^3} \sqrt{1 + 3\sin^2\lambda}$$

where $R$ in this case has units of Earth radii ($R = r/R_E$).

== Invariant latitude ==
Invariant latitude is a parameter that describes where a particular magnetic field line touches the surface of Earth. It is given by

$$\Lambda = \arccos\left(\sqrt{1/L}\right)$$

or

$$L = 1/\cos^2\left(\Lambda\right)$$

where $\Lambda$ is the invariant latitude and $L$ is the L-shell describing the magnetic field line in question.

On the surface of Earth, the invariant latitude ($\Lambda$) is equal to the magnetic latitude ($\lambda$).

== See also ==
- Dipole
- Dynamo theory
- Geomagnetic pole
- International Geomagnetic Reference Field (IGRF)
- Magnetosphere
- World Magnetic Model (WMM)
