= International Real-time Magnetic Observatory Network =

INTERMAGNET
- International Real-time Magnetic Observatory Network
- Objective: Study of Earth's magnetic field
- Participants: approx. 50 institutes and over 100 magnetic observatories
- Duration: 1987 –
- Website: intermagnet.org

The International Real-time Magnetic Observatory Network (INTERMAGNET) is a world-wide consortium of institutes operating ground-based magnetometers recording the absolute level of the Earth's time-varying magnetic field, to an agreed set of standards. INTERMAGNET has its roots in discussions held at the Workshop on Magnetic Observatory Instruments in Ottawa, Canada, in August 1986 and at the Nordic Comparison Meeting in Chambon La Foret, France, in May 1987. A pilot scheme between USGS and BGS was described in the sessions of Division V of the International Association of Geomagnetism and Aeronomy at the 19th General Assembly of the International Union of Geodesy and Geophysics in Vancouver, Canada, in August 1987. This scheme used the GOES East satellite to successfully transfer geomagnetic data between the two organisations. INTERMAGNET was founded soon after in order to extend the network of observatories communicating in this way. 62 different institutes are now members of the INTERMAGNET consortium, and, since 1991, data have been contributed to INTERMAGNET from approximately 150 observatories. INTERMAGNET is a member of the World Data System of the International Science Council, and it is closely associated with the International Association of Geomagnetism and Aeronomy.

INTERMAGNET is organised into an Executive Council, formed of representatives of its founding members (NRCan – Canada, IPGP – France, BGS – United Kingdom, USGS – United States of America), and an Operations Committee, formed of members from many institutes concerned with geomagnetism and with operating magnetic observatories. The Operations Committee handles applications for membership of INTERMAGNET, implements updates to the technical manual. and oversees the maintenance of standards and the annual publication of data. Intermagnet operational standards and other technical information are summarized in the technical manual.

== Data ==
One-minute resolution data time series are available from all IMOs (INTERMAGNET Magnetic Observatories): these are described as "definitive data", as they are not subject to future reprocessing or re-calibration and therefore represent INTERMAGNET's "gold-standard" data product for scientific and other uses. Definitive data are therefore considered an accurate representation of the vector geomagnetic field and its time dependence at the location of each IMO. Reported or raw, unprocessed data are reported promptly from each observatory (for some stations, within an hour of acquisition). The one-minute resolution data are time-stamped to the start of each minute and are derived from faster sampled data according to digital filters that accord with the technical standards for one-minute data.

INTERMAGNET introduced (as of 2016) a new set of standards for the measuring, recording and reporting of 1-second sampled data by IMOs. INTERMAGNET also introduced (in 2013) a category of "quasi-definitive" 1-minute data to encourage the prompt reporting of observatory data that are demonstrably "close" to "definitive data" (within 5nT). Quasi-definitive data are intended to encourage the uptake of ground-based magnetometer data alongside the high volumes of satellite survey data, particularly for the construction and geophysical interpretation of regional and global magnetic field models.

The IMOs must send reported and adjusted data within 72 hours to geomagnetic information nodes (GINs), located in Paris, France; Edinburgh, United Kingdom; Golden, USA; Kyoto, Japan. In practise, however, many IMOs distribute their data to the GINs much more promptly.

INTERMAGNET data are available in several formats and data are published annually. Prior to 2014, definitive 1-minute data were published on CD or DVD and each IMO received a copy of all data. Until 2016 IMO data were made available on USB memory stick (additional copies available on application to the INTERMAGNET secretary). For the 2016 data release and to mark 25 years of digital data, INTERMAGNET released a final USB stick containing all data published since 1991. For later years definitive data are available in digital form from the website only.

=== INTERMAGNET Reference Data Set ===
The INTERMAGNET Reference Data Set (IRDS) is a collection of definitive digital values of the Earth's magnetic field at the participating observatories. It is released annually and includes all definitive data since 1991, including any corrections and adjustments to data released in previous years. As a concept the IRDS probably most closely resembles the update cycle of the IGRF.

== Recent Developments (2014–2019) ==
=== Metadata ===
INTERMAGNET has developed a metadata schema as part of its plans for data interoperability.

=== Web services ===
INTERMAGNET data are now retrievable and accessible via API.

=== Quasi-definitive data ===
Quasi-definitive data (QDD) are data that have been corrected using provisional baselines. Produced soon after acquisition, 98% of the differences between QDD and definitive data (X-north, Y-east, Z-down) monthly mean values should be less than 5nT. QDD are intended to support field modelling activities during the modern satellite survey era, providing extra constraints on, for example, models of the field secular variation.

=== Data licensing ===
INTERMAGNET data are subject to conditions of use and are licensed under Creative Commons CC-BY-NC. Commercial use of data may be possible through direct permission of the institute that is responsible for the data requested.

=== Digital object identifiers ===
In 2019 INTERMAGNET published its first DOI, for the 2013 annual definitive data set. INTERMAGNET intended that DOIs would become a standard means of data recognition and citing, for example by minting DOI for each annual IRDS.

=== Technical manual ===
Version 5.0 of the INTERMAGNET technical manual will be available on the website from September 2019.

=== Software ===
A number of software tools are available from INTERMAGNET for the easy checking, plotting and manipulation of data. INTERMAGNET welcomes community development of tools and software and encourages contributions.

== Applications of INTERMAGNET data ==
INTERMAGNET data are used for a wide variety of applications, including geomagnetic field mapping, monitoring variable space-weather conditions, directional drilling for oil and gas, aeromagnetic surveying, assessment of geomagnetic hazards (including space weather), and fundamental research on the Earth's interior and surrounding space and atmospheric environments. Standard products utilizing INTERMAGNET data include: magnetic indices (e.g. K, Dst), the World Magnetic Model and the International Geomagnetic Reference Field.
