= Magnetic mirror point =

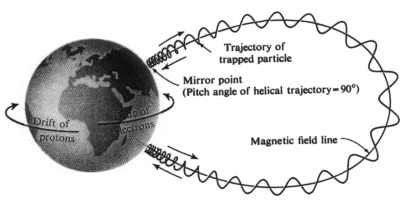
Diagram of a magnetic mirror point

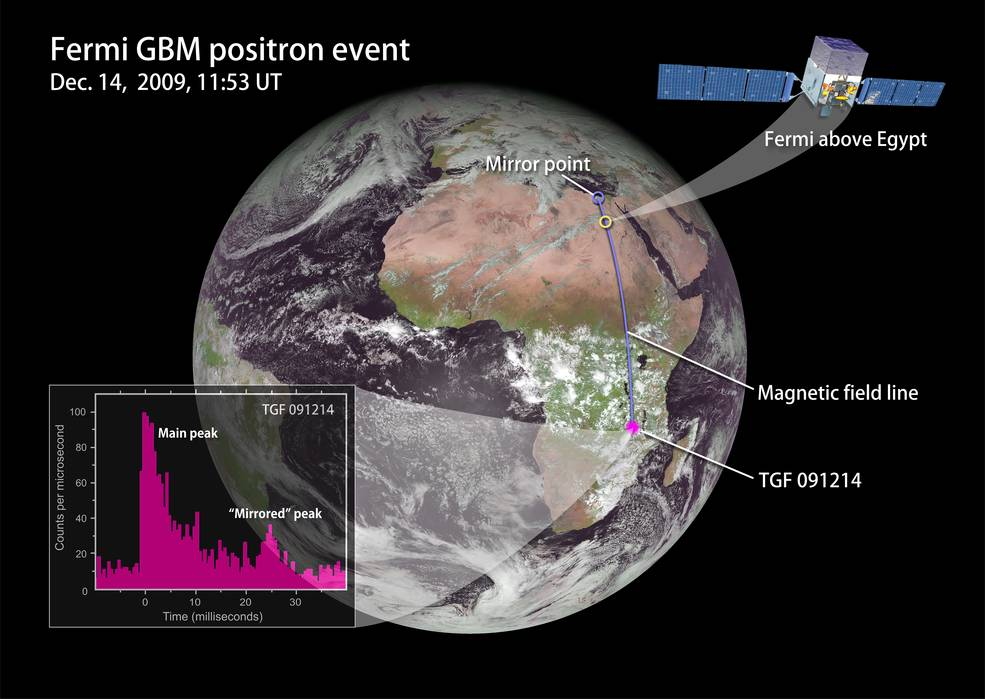
A terrestrial gamma-ray flash (TGF) event with associated electron/positron beams which were detected by the Fermi Gamma-ray Space Telescope as well as its bounce from the magnetic mirror point

In astrophysics, a magnetic mirror point is a point where the motion of a charged particle trapped in a magnetic field (such as the (approximately) dipole field of the Earth) reverses its direction. More precisely, it is the point where the projection of the particle's velocity vector in the direction of the field vector is equal to zero.

Whenever charged particles from the sun hit Earth's magnetosphere, it is observed that the magnetic field of Earth reverses direction.

Since the forces that generate our magnetic field are constantly changing, the field itself is also in continual flux, its strength waxing and waning over time. This causes the location of Earth's magnetic north and south poles to gradually shift, and to even completely flip locations every 300,000 years or so.

== See also ==
- Magnetic mirror
- L-shell
- Dipole model of the Earth's magnetic field
- List of artificial radiation belts
