= Anderson function =

Set of basis functions

Anderson functions describe the projection of a magnetic dipole field in a given direction at points along an arbitrary line. They are useful in the study of magnetic anomaly detection, with historical applications in submarine hunting and underwater mine detection. They approximately describe the signal detected by a total field sensor as the sensor passes by a target (assuming the targets signature is small compared to the Earth's magnetic field).

== Definition ==
The magnetic field from a magnetic dipole along a given line, and in any given direction can be described by the following basis functions:

$\frac{\theta^{~i-1}}{(\theta^2+1)^{\frac{5}{2}}}, \text{ for } i = 1,2,3$

which are known as Anderson functions.

Definitions:

- $\vec{m}$ is the dipole's strength and direction
- $\vec{B}_E$ is the projected direction (often the Earth's magnetic field in a region)
- $x$ is the position along the line
- $\hat{v}$ points in the direction of the line
- $\vec{r}$ is a vector from the dipole to the point of closest approach (CPA) of the line
- $\theta = x/r$, a dimensionless quantity for simplification

The total magnetic field along the line is given by

$B(\theta) = \frac{\mu_0}{4\pi}\frac{|m|}{r^3}\left(\frac{A_1}{(\theta^2+1)^{\frac{5}{2}}} + \frac{A_2\theta^1}{(\theta^2+1)^{\frac{5}{2}}} + \frac{A_3\theta^2}{(\theta^2+1)^{\frac{5}{2}}} \right)$

where $\mu_0$ is the magnetic constant, and $A_{1,2,3}$ are the Anderson coefficients, which depend on the geometry of the system. These are

$$\begin{align}
A_1 &= 3(\hat{m}\cdot\hat{r})(\hat{r}\cdot\hat{B}_E) -~~(\hat{m}\cdot\hat{B}_E) \\
A_2 &= 3(\hat{m}\cdot\hat{r})(\hat{v}\cdot\hat{B}_E) + 3(\hat{m}\cdot\hat{v})(\hat{r}\cdot\hat{B}_E)  \\
A_3 &= 3(\hat{m}\cdot\hat{v})(\hat{v}\cdot\hat{B}_E) -~~(\hat{m}\cdot\hat{B}_E)
\end{align}$$

where $\hat{m},\hat{r},$ and $\hat{B}_E$ are unit vectors (given by $\frac{\vec{m}}{|\vec{m}|}, \frac{\vec{r}}{|\vec{r}|},$ and $\frac{\vec{B}_E}{|\vec{B}_E|}$, respectively).

Note, the antisymmetric portion of the function is represented by the second function. Correspondingly, the sign of $A_2$ depends on how $\vec{v}$ is defined (e.g. direction is 'forward').

== Total field measurements ==
The total field measurement resulting from a dipole field $\vec{B}_D$ in the presence of a background field $\vec{B}_E$ (such as earth magnetic field) is

$$\begin{align}
|B| &= \sqrt{(\vec{B}_D+\vec{B}_E)\cdot(\vec{B}_D+\vec{B}_E)} \\
&= |B_E|\sqrt{1+\frac{2\vec{B}_D\cdot\vec{B}_E}{|B_E|^2}+\frac{\vec{B}_D^2}{|B_E|^2}} \\
&\approx |B_E|+\frac{\vec{B}_D\cdot\vec{B}_E}{|B_E|}, &|B_E|\gg |B_D|.
\end{align}$$

The last line is an approximation that is accurate if the background field is much larger than contributions from the dipole. In such a case the total field reduces to the sum of the background field, and the projection of the dipole field onto the background field. This means that the total field can be accurately described as an Anderson function with an offset.
