= South magnetic pole =

Point on Earth's Southern Hemisphere

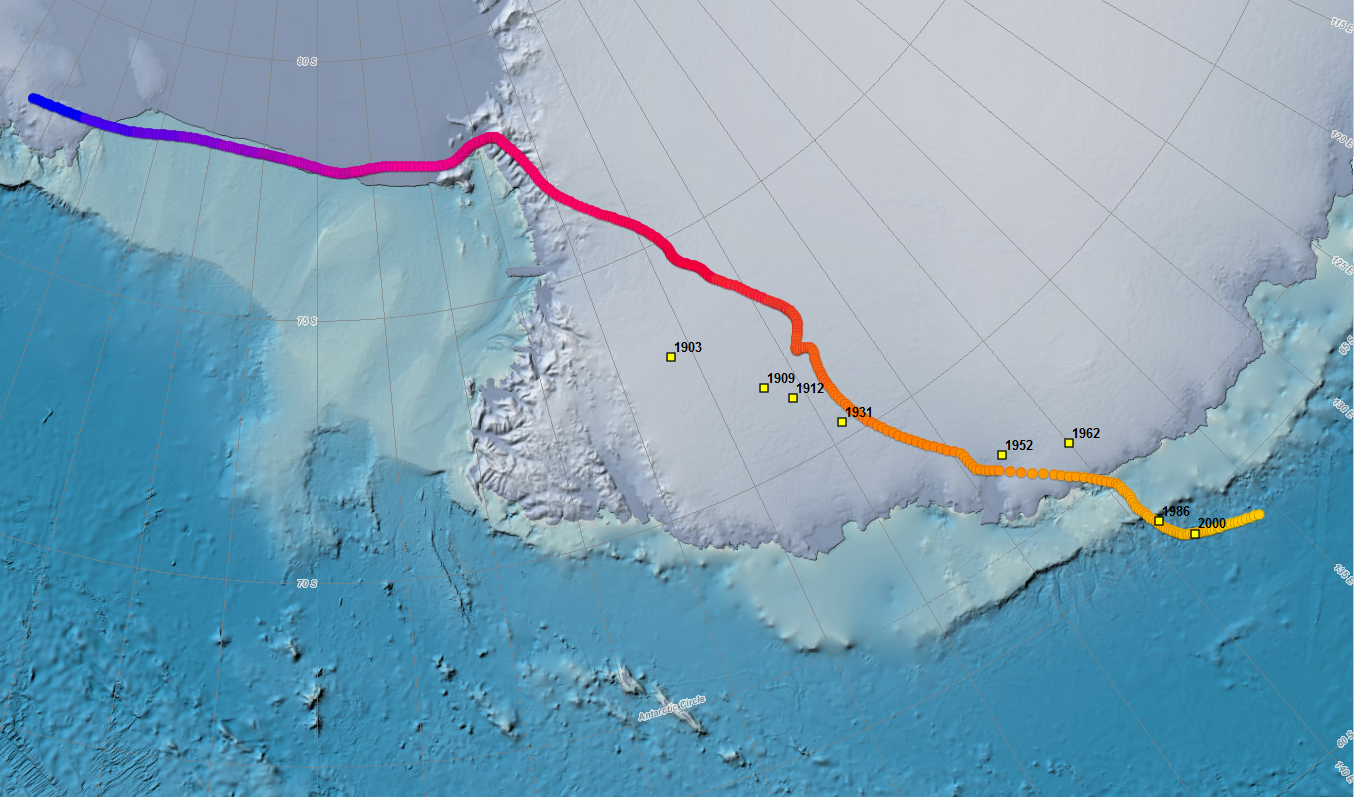
Observed south dipoles during 1903–2000 are yellow squares. IGRF-12 Modeled pole locations from 1590 to 2020 are circles progressing from blue to yellow.

The south magnetic pole, also known as the magnetic south pole, is the point on Earth's Southern Hemisphere where the geomagnetic field lines are directed perpendicular to the nominal surface. The Geomagnetic South Pole, a related point, is the south pole of an ideal dipole model of Earth's magnetic field that most closely fits Earth's actual magnetic field.

For historical reasons, the "end" of a freely hanging magnet that points (roughly) north is itself called the "north pole" of the magnet, and the other end, pointing south, is called the magnet's "south pole".

The south magnetic pole is constantly shifting due to changes in Earth's magnetic field.

As of 2005, it was calculated to lie at 64°31′48″S 137°51′36″E, placing it off the coast of Antarctica, between Adélie Land and Wilkes Land. In 2015 it lay at 64.28°S 136.59°E (est). That point lies outside the Antarctic Circle. Due to polar drift, the pole is moving northwest by about 10 to 15 kilometres (6 to 9 mi) per year. Its current distance from the actual Geographic South Pole is approximately 2,860 km (1,780 mi). The nearest permanent science station is Dumont d'Urville Station. While the north magnetic pole began wandering very quickly in the mid 1990s, the movement of the south magnetic pole did not show a matching change of speed.

Recent locations of Earth's magnetic (dip) poles, IGRF-13 estimate
Year	1990 (definitive)	2000 (definitive)	2010 (definitive)	2020
North magnetic pole	78.095°N 103.689°W	80.972°N 109.640°W	85.020°N 132.834°W	86.494°N 162.867°E
South magnetic pole	64.910°S 138.902°E	64.661°S 138.303°E	64.432°S 137.325°E	64.081°S 135.866°E

== Expeditions ==
Early unsuccessful attempts to reach the magnetic south pole included those of French explorer Jules Dumont d'Urville (1837–1840), American Charles Wilkes (expedition of 1838–1842) and Briton James Clark Ross (expedition of 1839–1843).

The first calculation of the magnetic inclination to locate the magnetic South Pole was made on 23 January 1838 by the hydrographer Clément Adrien Vincendon-Dumoulin, a member of the Dumont d'Urville expedition in Antarctica and Oceania on the corvettes Astrolabe and Zélée in 1837–1840, which discovered Adélie Land.

On 16 January 1909, three men (Douglas Mawson, Edgeworth David, and Alistair Mackay) from Sir Ernest Shackleton's Nimrod Expedition claimed to have found the south magnetic pole, which was at that time located on land. They planted a flagpole at the spot and claimed it for the British Empire. However, as of 2016, there was some doubt as to whether their location was correct. The approximate position of the pole on 16 January 1909 was 72.25°S 155.15°E.

== Fits to global data sets ==
The south magnetic pole has also been estimated by fits to global sets of data such as the World Magnetic Model (WMM) and the International Geomagnetic Reference Field (IGRF). For earlier years back to about 1600, the model GUFM1 is used, based on a compilation of data from ship logs.

== South geomagnetic pole ==
Earth's geomagnetic field can be approximated by a tilted dipole (like a bar magnet) placed at the center of Earth. The south geomagnetic pole is the point where the axis of this best-fitting tilted dipole intersects Earth's surface in the southern hemisphere. As of 2005, it was calculated to be located at 79.74°S 108.22°E, near Vostok Station. Because the field is not an exact dipole, the south geomagnetic pole does not coincide with the south magnetic pole. Furthermore, the south geomagnetic pole is wandering for the same reason its northern geomagnetic counterpart wanders.

== See also ==
- North magnetic pole
- Polar alignment
