= L-shell =

Mathematical parameter used to describe planetary magnetic field lines

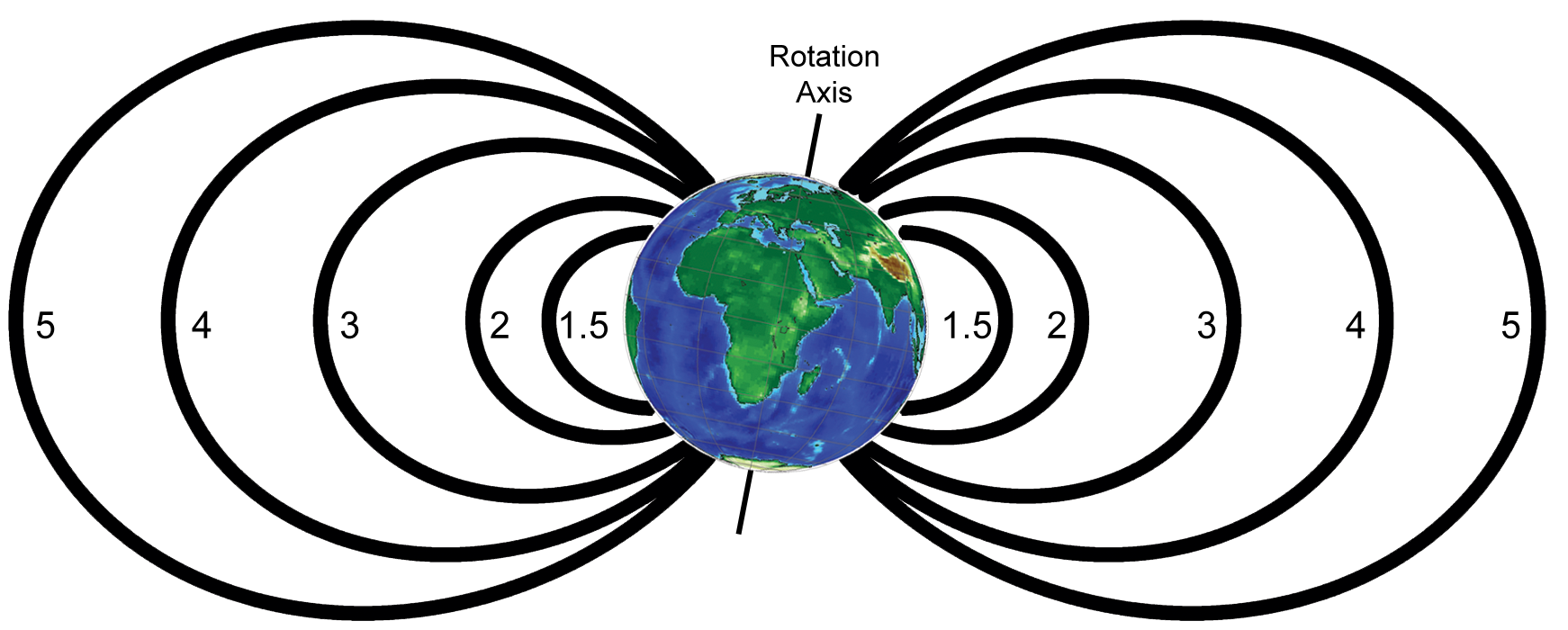
Plot showing field lines (which, in three dimensions would describe "shells") for L-values 1.5, 2, 3, 4 and 5 using a dipole model of the Earth's magnetic field

The L-shell, L-value, or McIlwain L-parameter (after Carl E. McIlwain) is a parameter describing a particular set of planetary magnetic field lines. Colloquially, L-value often describes the set of magnetic field lines which cross the Earth's magnetic equator at a number of Earth-radii equal to the L-value. For example, $L = 2$ describes the set of the Earth's magnetic field lines which cross the Earth's magnetic equator two earth radii from the center of the Earth. L-shell parameters can also describe the magnetic fields of other planets. In such cases, the parameter is renormalized for that planet's radius and magnetic field model.

Although L-value is formally defined in terms of the Earth's true instantaneous magnetic field (or a high-order model like IGRF), it is often used to give a general picture of magnetic phenomena near the Earth, in which case it can be approximated using the dipole model of the Earth's magnetic field.

== Charged particle motions in a dipole field ==
Map of L-shell field line locations on the surface of the Earth. The real terrestrial field is approximately dipolar, but misaligned with the rotation axis, and offset a few hundred km in the direction opposite to the South Atlantic Anomaly.

The motions of low-energy charged particles in the Earth's magnetic field (or in any nearly-dipolar magnetic field) can be usefully described in terms of McIlwain's (B,L) coordinates, the first of which, B is just the magnitude (or length) of the magnetic field vector. This description is most valuable when the gyroradius of the charged particle orbit is small compared to the spatial scale for changes in the field. Then a charged particle will basically follow a helical path orbiting the local field line. In a local coordinate system {x,y,z} where z is along the field, the transverse motion will be nearly a circle, orbiting the "guiding center", that is the center of the orbit or the local B line, with the gyroradius and frequency characteristic of cyclotron motion for the field strength, while the simultaneous motion along z will be at nearly uniform velocity, since the component of the Lorentz force along the field line is zero.

At the next level of approximation, as the particle orbits and moves along the field line, along which the field changes slowly, the radius of the orbit changes so as to keep the magnetic flux enclosed by the orbit constant. Since the Lorentz force is strictly perpendicular to the velocity, it cannot change the energy of a charged particle moving in it. Thus the particle's kinetic energy remains constant. Then so also must its speed be constant. Then it can be shown that the particle's velocity parallel to the local field must decrease if the field is increasing along its z motion, and increase if the field decreases, while the components of the velocity transverse to the field increase or decrease so as to keep the magnitude of the total velocity constant. Conservation of energy prevents the transverse velocity from increasing without limit, and eventually the longitudinal component of the velocity becomes zero, while the pitch angle, of the particle with respect to the field line, becomes 90°. Then the longitudinal motion is stopped and reversed, and the particle is reflected back towards regions of weaker field, the guiding center now retracing its previous motion along the field line, with the particle's transverse velocity decreasing and its longitudinal velocity increasing.

In the (approximately) dipole field of the Earth, the magnitude of the field is greatest near the magnetic poles, and least near the magnetic Equator. Thus after the particle crosses the Equator, it will again encounter regions of increasing field, until it once again stops at the magnetic mirror point, on the opposite side of the Equator. The result is that, as the particle orbits its guiding center on the field line, it bounces back and forth between the north mirror point and the south mirror point, remaining approximately on the same field line. The particle is therefore endlessly trapped, and cannot escape from the region of the Earth. Particles with too-small pitch angles may strike the top of the atmosphere if they are not mirrored before their field line reaches too close to the Earth, in which case they will eventually be scattered by atoms in the air, lose energy, and be lost from the belts.

However, for particles which mirror at safe altitudes, (in yet a further level of approximation) the fact that the field generally increases towards the center of the Earth means that the curvature on the side of the orbit nearest the Earth is somewhat greater than on the opposite side, so that the orbit has a slightly non-circular, with a (prolate) cycloidal shape, and the guiding center slowly moves perpendicular both to the field line and to the radial direction. The guiding center of the cyclotron orbit, instead of moving exactly along the field line, therefore drifts slowly east or west (depending on the sign of the charge of the particle), and the local field line connecting the two mirror points at any moment, slowly sweeps out a surface connecting them as it moves in longitude. Eventually the particle will drift entirely around the Earth, and the surface will be closed upon itself. These drift surfaces, nested like the skin of an onion, are the surfaces of constant L in the McIlwain coordinate system. They apply not only for a perfect dipole field, but also for fields that are approximately dipolar. For a given particle, as long as only the Lorentz force is involved, B and L remain constant and particles can be trapped indefinitely. Use of (B,L) coordinates provides us with a way of mapping the real, non-dipolar terrestrial or planetary field into coordinates that behave essentially like those of a perfect dipole. The L parameter is traditionally labeled in Earth-radii, of the point where the shell crosses the magnetic Equator, of the equivalent dipole. B is measured in gauss.

== Equation for L in a Dipole Magnetic Field ==
In a centered dipole magnetic field model, the path along a given L shell can be described as
$$r = L\cos^2\lambda$$
where $r$ is the radial distance (in planetary radii) to a point on the line, $\lambda$ is its geomagnetic latitude, and $L$ is the L-shell of interest.

== L-shells on Earth ==
For the Earth, L-shells uniquely define regions of particular geophysical interest. Certain physical phenomena occur in the ionosphere and magnetosphere at characteristic L-shells. For instance, auroral light displays are most common around L=6, can reach L=4 during moderate disturbances, and during the most severe geomagnetic storms, may approach L=2. The Van Allen radiation belts roughly correspond to L=1.5–2.5, and L=4–6. The plasmapause is typically around L=5.

== L-shells on Jupiter ==
The Jovian magnetic field is the strongest planetary field in the Solar System. Its magnetic field traps electrons with energies greater than 500 MeV The characteristic L-shells are L=6, where electron distribution undergoes a marked hardening (increase of energy), and L=20-50, where the electron energy decreases to the VHF regime and the magnetosphere eventually gives way to the solar wind. Because Jupiter's trapped electrons contain so much energy, they more easily diffuse across L-shells than trapped electrons in Earth's magnetic field. One consequence of this is a more continuous and smoothly-varying radio-spectrum emitted by trapped electrons in gyro-resonance.

== See also ==
- Earth's magnetic field
- Dipole model of the Earth's magnetic field
- Guiding center
- Geomagnetic latitude
- International Geomagnetic Reference Field
- TEP
- World Magnetic Model

== Other references ==
- Tascione, Thomas F. (1994), Introduction to the Space Environment (2nd ed.), Malabar, FL: Kreiger
- Margaret Kivelson and Christopher Russell (1995), Introduction to Space Physics, New York, NY: Cambridge University Press, pp. 166–167
