= Geomagnetic secular variation =

Short-term changes in the Earth's magnetic field

Geomagnetic secular variation is the changes in the Earth's magnetic field on time scales of about a year or more. These changes mostly reflect changes in the Earth's interior, while more rapid changes mostly originate in the ionosphere or magnetosphere.

The geomagnetic field changes on time scales from milliseconds to millions of years. Shorter time scales mostly arise from currents in the ionosphere and magnetosphere, and some changes can be traced to geomagnetic storms or daily variations in currents. Changes over time scales of a year or more mostly reflect changes in the Earth's interior, particularly the iron-rich core. These changes are referred to as secular variation. In most models, the secular variation is the amortized time derivative of the magnetic field $\mathbf{B}$, $\dot{\mathbf{B}}$. The second derivative, $\ddot{\mathbf{B}}$ is the secular acceleration.

== Recent changes ==
Estimated declination contours by year, 1590 to 1990 (click to see variation).

Strength of the axial dipole component of Earth's magnetic field from 1600 to 2020, according to three models.

Secular variation can be observed in measurements at magnetic observatories, some of which have been operating for hundreds of years (the Kew Observatory, for example). Over such a time scale, magnetic declination is observed to vary over tens of degrees. A movie on the right shows how global declinations have changed over the last few centuries.

To analyze global patterns of change in the geomagnetic field, geophysicists fit the field data to a spherical harmonic expansion (see International Geomagnetic Reference Field). The terms in this expansion can be divided into a dipolar part, like the field around a bar magnet, and a non-dipolar part. The dipolar part dominates the geomagnetic field and determines the direction of the geomagnetic poles. The direction and intensity of the dipole change over time. Over the last two centuries the dipole strength has been decreasing at a rate of about 6.3% per century. At this rate of decrease, the field would reach zero in about 1600 years. However, this strength is about average for the last 7 thousand years, and the current rate of change is not unusual.

A prominent feature in the non-dipolar part of the secular variation is a westward drift at a rate of about 0.2 degrees per year. This drift is not the same everywhere and has varied over time. The globally averaged drift has been westward since about 1400 AD but eastward between about 1000 AD and 1400 AD.

== Paleomagnetic secular variation ==
Changes that predate magnetic observatories are recorded in archaeological and geological materials. Such changes are referred to as paleomagnetic secular variation or paleosecular variation (PSV). The records typically include long periods of small change with occasional large changes reflecting geomagnetic excursions and geomagnetic reversals.

The Levantine Iron Age anomaly was a fast and spatially localized geomagnetic positive anomaly which took place in the Levant, with maxima at about 950, 750 and 500 BCE.

== See also ==
- Geomagnetic jerk
- Secular variation
