= Magnetic potential =

Magnetic potential may refer to:

- Magnetic vector potential, the vector whose curl is equal to the magnetic B field
- Magnetic scalar potential, the magnetic analogue of electric potential
