= Geomagnetic latitude =

Parameter defined by the axis of the geomagnetic dipole

Geomagnetic latitude, or magnetic latitude (MLAT), is a parameter analogous to geographic latitude, except that, instead of being defined relative to the geographic poles, it is defined by the axis of the geomagnetic dipole, which can be accurately extracted from the International Geomagnetic Reference Field (IGRF). Further, Magnetic Local Time (MLT) is the geomagnetic dipole equivalent to geographic longitude.

== See also ==
- Earth's magnetic field
- Geomagnetic equator
- Ionosphere
- L-shell
- Magnetosphere
- World Magnetic Model (WMM)
