= Magnetic pole =

Magnetic pole may refer to:

- One of the two ends of a magnet
- Magnetic monopole, a hypothetical elementary particle
- The magnetic poles of astronomical bodies, a special case of magnets, especially:
  - The North magnetic pole of planet Earth, a point where the north end of a compass points downward
  - The South magnetic pole of planet Earth, a point where the south end of a compass points downward
