= IRAS 13349+2438 =

Seyfert 1 galaxy in the constellation Boötes

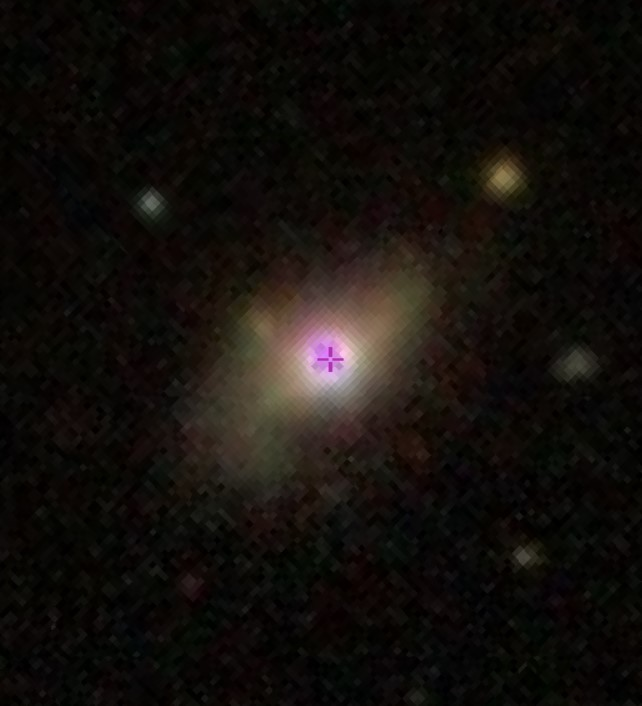
- IRAS 13349+2438 captured by SDSS

Observation data (J2000.0 epoch)
- Constellation: Boötes
- Right ascension: 13^{h} 37^{m} 18.71^{s}
- Declination: +24° 23′ 03.27″
- Redshift: 0.107641
- Heliocentric radial velocity: 32,270 km/s
- Distance: 1.447 Gly (443.0 Mpc)
- Apparent magnitude (V): 15.0
- magnitude (K): 10.4

Characteristics
- Type: Sy1
- Apparent size (V): 0.42' × 0.27'
- Notable features: prototype infrared-luminous quasar

Other designations
- SFRS 270, PGC 101275, NVSS J133718+242302, IRAS F13349+2438, 2RE J1337+244, RBS 1295

IRAS 13349+2438 is a Seyfert galaxy located in the constellation of Boötes. It is located 1.45 billion light-years from Earth and a prototype infrared-luminous low-redshift quasar with a projected luminosity of 2 × 10^{46} erg s^{−1} according to Beichman who discovered it in 1986.

IRAS 13349+2438 has a spiral-like appearance according to digital imaging made on the galaxy's host and the nearby environment. It has a companion galaxy, suggesting the galaxy might have interacted with it, given the evidence of tidal structures. It is likely the interaction has given rise to its quasar activity as interstellar dust and gas are supplied to the galaxy's nucleus. Additionally, IRAS 13349+2438 shows increasing high optical polarization at declining wavebands. It is a radio-quiet quasar despite weak radio emission being reported at 6 GHz.

The galaxy has strong properties of Fe II emission and weak [O III] that is relative to Hβ. A study made by Chandra X-ray spectrum with the HETGS grating spectrometer, also confirms IRAS 13349+2438 has a rich absorption spectra of quasar outflows. It is also said the object contains a double-peaked absorption measure distribution whom researchers finds the object has an ionized column density of NH = (1.2 ± 0.3) × 10^{22} cm^{−2}.

IRAS 13349+2438 has been observed by the XMM Newton Observatory on a few occasions. In 2000, XMM Newton discovered that the galaxy contains several broad absorption lines from various ionized elements like nitrogen, oxygen and iron L-shell ions. Further evidence shows, IRAS 13349+2438 also has an unresolved transitional array of an inner-shell absorption, possibly misidentified to be an OVII edge through observations made by moderate resolution spectrometers. In 2018, IRAS 13349+2438 was observed again, which it contains large numbers of absorption lines originating from warm absorption zones with measured velocities of ~-600 km s^{−1}. A joint study by NuSTAR and XMM Newton confirms presence of iron absorption lines at both 8 and 9 keV, with velocities of 0.14c and 0.27c. Based on findings, IRAS 13349+2438 shows possible detections of multiphase ultra-fast outflows.

In a study sample of narrow-line Seyfert galaxies, IRAS 13349+2438 contains an unresolved core region with an approximate size of 540 × 235 parsecs. It has a high brightness temperature of ~72,000 K, indicating the galaxy has a low-power relativistic beamed jet. Furthermore, it has an average star formation rate over 100 Myr of 105.8 ± 29.5 M_{Θ} yr^{−1} and mass of 21.44 ± 2.68 10^{10} M_{Θ}.
