= Geomagnetic pole =

Poles of a best fit to the Earth's field

Illustration of the difference between geomagnetic poles (N_{m} and S_{m}) and geographical poles (N_{g} and S_{g})

Location of the north magnetic pole and the north geomagnetic pole in 2017.

The geomagnetic poles are antipodal points where the axis of a best-fitting dipole intersects the surface of Earth. This theoretical dipole is equivalent to a powerful bar magnet inside the Earth. The best-fitting dipole generally results from a theoretical magnet that is not precisely at the center of the Earth, this is known as the eccentric dipole model. For modern-day Earth (unlike most planets in our Solar System) a simpler centered dipole model is a close enough approximation to be used for some purposes. There are historical periods when the Earth's field did not resemble a dipole at all.

In contrast to the geomagnetic poles, the observed magnetic poles or dip poles of the Earth are places where the actual magnetic field intersects the surface. The magnetic poles are not antipodal: asymmetries in the earth and variations in its magnetic field mean that the line on which they lie does not pass through Earth's center.

Owing to the motion of fluid in the Earth's outer core, the magnetic field is constantly moving, in what is called geomagnetic secular variation. This leads to short-term changes in the magnetic and geomagnetic poles.

Although the geomagnetic poles average out local variations in the magnetic field, they are useful in geophysics as an efficient and more slowly-changing approximation than the magnetic poles. For example, since it is the entire field that determines the positions of auroras, the geomagnetic poles are an effective model for predicting their behavior.

Recent locations of Earth's geomagnetic (auroral) poles, IGRF-13 fit
Year	1990 (definitive)	2000 (definitive)	2010 (definitive)	2020
North geomagnetic pole	79.2°N 71.1°W	79.6°N 71.6°W	80.1°N 72.2°W	80.7°N 72.7°W
South geomagnetic pole	79.2°S 108.9°E	79.6°S 108.4°E	80.1°S 107.8°E	80.7°S 107.3°E
Magnetic dipole moment (10^{22} A ⋅ m^{2})	7.84	7.79	7.75	7.71

== Definition ==
As a first-order approximation, the Earth's magnetic field can be modeled as a simple dipole (like a bar magnet), tilted about 9.6° with respect to the Earth's rotation axis (which defines the Geographic North and Geographic South Poles) and centered at the Earth's center. This is known as the centered dipole model of the field. The North and South Geomagnetic Poles are the antipodal points where the axis of this theoretical dipole intersects the Earth's surface. Thus, unlike the actual magnetic poles, the geomagnetic poles always have an equal degree of latitude and supplementary degrees of longitude respectively (2017: Lat. 80.5°N, 80.5°S; Long. 72.8°W, 107.2°E). If the Earth's magnetic field were a perfect dipole, the field lines would be vertical to the surface at the Geomagnetic Poles, and they would align with the North and South magnetic poles, with the North Magnetic Pole at the south end of dipole.

As a better second-order approximation, the field can be modeled as a dipole somewhere other than the center of the Earth. This is known as the eccentric dipole model. Even this approximation is imperfect; the magnetic poles migrate a greater distance each year than the geomagnetic poles, and usually lie hundreds of kilometers apart.

== Location ==
Like the North Magnetic Pole, the North Geomagnetic Pole attracts the north pole of a bar magnet and so is in a physical sense actually a magnetic south pole. It is the center of the 'open' magnetic field lines which connect to the interplanetary magnetic field and provide a direct route for the solar wind to reach the ionosphere. As of 2020, it was located at 80.65°N 72.68°W, on Ellesmere Island, Nunavut, Canada, compared to 2015, when it was located at 80.37°N 72.62°W, also on Ellesmere Island.

The South Geomagnetic Pole is the point where the axis of this best-fitting tilted dipole intersects the Earth's surface in the southern hemisphere. As of 2020, it is located at 80.65°S 107.32°E, whereas in 2005, it was calculated to be located at 79.74°S 108.22°E, near Vostok Station.

Because the Earth's actual magnetic field is not an exact dipole, the (calculated) North and South Geomagnetic Poles do not coincide with the North and South Magnetic Poles. If the Earth's magnetic fields were exactly dipolar, the north pole of a magnetic compass needle would point directly at the North Geomagnetic Pole. In practice, it does not because the geomagnetic field that originates in the core has a more complex non-dipolar part, and magnetic anomalies in the Earth's crust also contribute to the local field.

The locations of geomagnetic poles are calculated by a statistical fit to measurements of the Earth's field by satellites and in geomagnetic observatories. This can be the International Geomagnetic Reference Field (covering a wide time-span in history) or the U.S. World Magnetic Model (only covering a five-year period).

== Movement ==
The geomagnetic poles move over time because the geomagnetic field is produced by motion of the molten iron alloys in the Earth's outer core. (See geodynamo.) Over the course of a day, variations in solar wind deflect the magnetic field and can make the poles swing in an oval of around 50 miles (80 km) in diameter. Each year, the poles migrate around 30 miles (48 km). Over the past 150 years, the poles have moved westward at a rate of 0.05° to 0.1° per year and closer to the true poles at 0.01° per year.

Over several thousand years, the average location of the geomagnetic poles coincides with the geographical poles. Paleomagnetists have long relied on the geocentric axial dipole (GAD) hypothesis, which states that — aside from during geomagnetic reversals — the time-averaged position of the geomagnetic poles has coincided with the geographic poles. There is paleomagnetic evidence supporting this hypothesis.

On the order of once every million years, the poles reverse (i.e., north switches place with south) although the time frame of this switching can be anywhere from every 10 thousand years to every 50 million years.

== Geomagnetic reversal ==
Over the life of the Earth, the orientation of Earth's magnetic field has reversed many times, with geomagnetic north becoming geomagnetic south and vice versa – an event known as a geomagnetic reversal. Evidence of geomagnetic reversals can be seen at mid-ocean ridges where tectonic plates move apart. As magma seeps out of the mantle and solidifies to become new ocean floor, the magnetic minerals in it are magnetized in the direction of the magnetic field. The study of this remanence is called palaeomagnetism. Thus, starting at the most recently formed ocean floor, one can read out the direction of the magnetic field in previous times as one moves farther away to older ocean floor.

== See also ==
- Earth's magnetic field
