= World Magnetic Model =

Large spatial-scale model of the Earth's magnetic field

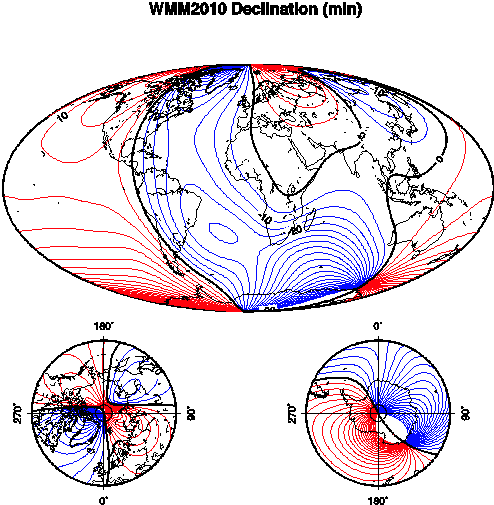
Magnetic declination map at sea-level for the year 2010 derived from WMM2010.

The World Magnetic Model (WMM) is a large spatial-scale representation of the Earth's magnetic field. It was developed jointly by the US National Geophysical Data Center and the British Geological Survey. The data and updates are issued by the US National Geospatial-Intelligence Agency and the UK Defence Geographic Centre.

The model consists of a degree and order 12 spherical harmonic expansion of the magnetic scalar potential of the geomagnetic main field generated in the Earth's core. Apart from the 168 spherical-harmonic "Gauss" coefficients, the model also has an equal number of spherical-harmonic secular variation coefficients predicting the temporal evolution of the field over the upcoming five-year epoch.

WMM is the standard geomagnetic model of the United States Department of Defense (DoD), the Ministry of Defence (United Kingdom), the North Atlantic Treaty Organization (NATO), the International Hydrographic Organization (IHO) navigation and attitude/heading reference, and the Federal Aviation Administration (FAA). It is also used widely in civilian navigation systems as the magnetic model of the World Geodetic System. For example, WMM is pre-installed in Android and iOS devices to correct for the magnetic declination. The WMM is produced by the U.S. National Geophysical Data Center (NGDC) in collaboration with the British Geological Survey (BGS). The model, associated software, and documentation are distributed by the NGDC on behalf of National Geospatial-Intelligence Agency (NGA).

Updated model coefficients are released at 5-year intervals, with WMM2015 (released Dec 15, 2014) supposed to last until December 31, 2019. However, due to extraordinarily large and erratic movements of the north magnetic pole, an out-of-cycle update (WMM2015v2) was released in February 2019 (delayed by a few weeks due to the U.S. federal government shutdown) to accurately model the magnetic field above 55° north latitude until the end of 2019. The next regular update (WMM2020) occurred in December 2019. The latest update (WMM2025) occurred in December 2024 and will remain valid until late 2029.

== Enhanced Magnetic Model (EMM) ==
The Enhanced Magnetic Model (EMM) is a sister product of the NGDC featuring a much higher amount of data to degree and order 790, giving a wavelength of 51 km as opposed to the 3000 km of WMM. At this resolution, it is not only able to model the Earth's magnetic field at the core-mantle boundary ("main field"), but also take into account magnetic anomalies caused by the minerals in the Earth's crust.

== See also ==
- International Geomagnetic Reference Field: another model, of similar quality, which models past years as well
- Runway numbering
