= Magnetic scalar potential =

Magnetic analog of electric potential valid outside materials

Magnetic scalar potential, ψ, is a physical quantity in classical electromagnetism analogous to electric potential. It is used to specify the magnetic H-field in cases when there are no free currents, in a manner analogous to using the electric potential to determine the electric field in electrostatics. One important use of ψ is to determine the magnetic field due to permanent magnets when their magnetization is known. The potential is valid in any simply connected region with zero current density, thus if currents are confined to wires or surfaces, piecemeal solutions can be stitched together to provide a description of the magnetic field at all points in space.

== Magnetic scalar potential ==
Magnetic scalar potential of flat cylinder magnets encoded as color from positive (magenta) through zero (yellow) to negative (cyan).

The scalar potential is a useful quantity in describing the magnetic field, especially for permanent magnets.

Where there is no free current and no displacement current,
$$\nabla\times\mathbf{H} = \mathbf{0},$$
so if this holds in simply connected domain we can define a magnetic scalar potential, ψ, as
$$\mathbf{H} = -\nabla\psi.$$
The dimension of ψ in SI base units is $\mathsf{A}$, which can be expressed in SI units as amperes.

Using the definition of H:
$$\nabla\cdot\mathbf{B} = \mu_{0}\nabla\cdot\left(\mathbf{H} + \mathbf{M}\right) = 0,$$
it follows that
$$\nabla^2 \psi = -\nabla\cdot\mathbf{H} = \nabla\cdot\mathbf{M}.$$

Here, ∇ ⋅ M acts as the source for magnetic field, much like ∇ ⋅ P acts as the source for electric field. So analogously to bound electric charge, the quantity
$$\rho_m = -\nabla \cdot \mathbf{M}$$
is called the bound magnetic charge density. Magnetic charges $q_m = \int \rho_m \, dV$ never occur isolated as magnetic monopoles, but only within dipoles and in magnets with a total magnetic charge sum of zero. The potential energy of a localized magnetic charge q_{m} in a magnetic scalar potential is
$$U = \mu_0\,q_m\psi,$$
and of a magnetic charge density distribution ρ_{m} in space
$$U = \mu_0 \int \rho_m \psi \, dV ,$$
where µ_{0} is the vacuum permeability. This is analogous to the potential energy $U = q V_E$ of an electric charge q in an electric potential V_E.

If there is free current, one may subtract the contributions of free current per Biot–Savart law from total magnetic field and solve the remainder with the scalar potential method.

== See also ==
- Magnetic vector potential
