= Anomaly (natural sciences) =

Persisting deviation

In the natural sciences, especially in atmospheric and Earth sciences involving applied statistics, an anomaly is a persisting deviation in a physical quantity from its expected value, e.g., the systematic difference between a measurement and a trend or a model prediction. Similarly, a standardized anomaly equals an anomaly divided by a standard deviation. A group of anomalies can be analyzed spatially, as a map, or temporally, as a time series. It should not be confused for an isolated outlier. There are examples in atmospheric sciences and in geophysics.

== Calculation ==
The location and scale measures used in forming an anomaly time-series may either be constant or may themselves be a time series or a map. For example, if the original time series consisted of daily mean temperatures, the effect of seasonal cycles might be removed using a deseasonalization filter.

Robust statistics, resistant to the effects of outliers, are sometimes used as the basis of the transformation.

== Examples ==
=== Atmospheric sciences ===
In the atmospheric sciences, the climatological annual cycle is often used as the expected value. Famous atmospheric anomalies are for instance the Southern Oscillation index (SOI) and the North Atlantic oscillation index. SOI is the atmospheric component of El Niño, while NAO plays an important role for European weather by modification of the exit of the Atlantic storm track. A climate normal can also be used to derive a climate anomaly.

=== Geophysics ===
- Gravity anomaly, difference between the observed gravity and a value predicted from a model
  - Bouguer anomaly, anomaly in gravimetry
  - Free-air anomaly, gravity anomaly that has been computed for latitude and corrected for elevation of the station
- Iridium anomaly, an unusual abundance of what is normally a very rare element in the Earth's crust
- Magnetic anomaly, local variation in the Earth's magnetic field
  - Bangui magnetic anomaly, in central Africa
  - Kursk Magnetic Anomaly, territory rich in iron ores located within Kursk Oblast, Belgorod Oblast, and Oryol Oblast
  - Temagami Magnetic Anomaly, large buried geologic structure in the Temagami region of Ontario, Canada

== See also ==
- Bias (statistics)
- Climate oscillation
- Frequency spectrum
- Innovation (signal processing)
- Least squares
- Least-squares spectral analysis
- Temperature anomaly
