= Mioara Mandea =

Romanian geophysics researcher

- Born: Romania
- Education: University of Bucharest; Institut de Physique du Globe de Paris; University Paris VII
- Awards: Officer, National Order of Merit (2023)
- Scientific career
- Workplaces: Centre National d'Etudes Spatiales

Mioara Mandea is the Head of the Science Coordination Department, Strategy Directorate at the Centre National d'Etudes Spatiales (National Center for Space Studies). Mioara Mandea’s research has had broad significance and a large impact in the community. One of her important accomplishments is the assembling of the geomagnetic time series at Paris, opening the path to other long magnetic series as Munich and Bucharest and dedicated studies. Over her entire career, she has been focused on the geomagnetic field and its variations, using data derived from magnetic observatories and satellites participating in elaborating useful models, such as the IGRF series. With GRACEFUL (GRavimetry, mAgnetism, rotation and CorE Flow), a Synergy project of the European Research Council in the framework of the European Union’s Horizon 2020 Mioara Mandea continues her precursory work related to the dynamical processes in Earth's fluid core seen by both magnetic and gravity variations.

The range of Mioara Mandea scientific accomplishments can best be judged from her more than 190 peer-reviewed publications, accompanied by contributions to more than 20 books or chapters in books and publications in proceedings and reports (https://www.mioara-mandea.eu/publications.html). As her CV notes, Mioara has been recognized with many significant awards, medals, and honors for her research. She is a recipient of the AGU International Award, of the EGU “Petrus Peregrinus” medal, and is an elected member of a few academies. Recently, she was awarded by the French President with the title of “Oficier de l’Ordre National du Merite”, elected correspondent member of the famous French “Bureau des Longitudes”, and awarded with the Emil Wiechert medal – the highest distinction of the DGG (Deutsche Geophysikalische Gesellschaft). In 2023, Mioara Mandea was elected President-elect of the International Union of Geodesy and Geophysics.

== Early life and education ==
Mioara Mandea was born in Romania. She started her scientific career in the Socialist Republic of Romania. She eventually studied engineering and geophysics at the University of Bucharest and graduated in 1982. She obtained a doctoral degree at the University of Bucharest in 1993. She moved to the Institut de Physique du Globe de Paris for her doctoral degree, completed her PhD in 1996. In 1994 she was made the Head of the French National Magnetic Observatory, and remained in this role until 2004. She earned an additional Habilitation à Diriger des Recherches at the University Paris VII in 2011. She moved to the Institut de Physique du Globe de Paris in 2009, and was made deputy director of the Arctic Center of the Versailles Saint-Quentin-en-Yvelines University in 2011. She was appointed Solid Earth programmes manager at the Centre National d'Etudes Spatiales in 2011. Since 2022 Mioara Mandea is Head "Science Coordination" Department, Strategy Directorate at the Centre National d'Etudes Spatiales.

== Research and career ==
Mioara Mandea leads the collection and analysis of geomagnetic data. Throughout her career, Mioara Mandea has been indeed involved in some important scientific areas, namely measuring the Earth's magnetic field, from ground to space, modelling the core magnetic field and its temporal variations (with a special emphasis on geomagnetic jerks.), as well as in investigating other field contributions (lithospheric and external fields), determining physical properties of the deep Earth's interior (with special studies on the lower mantle conductivity and fluid motions at the core-mantle boundary), studying Planetary magnetism, mainly for Mars, Moon and Mercury.

Mioara Mandea has designed new data acquisition and analytical platforms to understand geomagnetic data. She pioneered the use of virtual observatories, and contributed significantly to the World Digital Magnetic Anomaly Map. She has explored the use of gravity data from satellites to understand the core–mantle boundary. She proposed that the gravimetric and magnetic signals at the Earth’s surface can be described by mass redistribution at the core–mantle boundary and secondary flow in the outer core. In 2019 she was awarded together with Veronique Dehant and Anny Cazenave, an ERC Synergy Grant for the project GRACEFUL. The project addresses fundamental shortcomings in the current understanding of the deep interior of our planet – in the fluid core in particular, with a long-term vision to open new frontiers and foster research on Earth’s interior by combining most up-to-date observations of the Earth gravity field, the magnetic field and the Earth rotation, as well as by developing precise modelling of the core flows (https://graceful.oma.be/)

=== Academic service ===
In 2005, Mioara Mandea was appointed Head of the Section Geomagnetism at the GFZ Helmholtz Centre for Geosciences, where she expanded new geomagnetic observatories. Mandea was made President of the European Geosciences Union Division Earth Magnetism and Rock physics in 2007. In 2012 Mandea was made the General Secretary of the European Geosciences Union. She also serves as President, Geophysical Maps Commission or the Commission for the Geological Map of the World. Over more than 10 years, Mioara Mandea served as secretary general of the International Association of Geomagnetism and Aeronomy, and four years as President. Currently she is President-elect of the International Union of Geodesy and Geophysics.

=== Awards and honours ===
- 1997 French Geological Society Van Straelen prize
- 1998 Romanian Academy Hepites prize
- 2000 Medal of the Slovak Academy of Sciences
- 2008 Academy of Romanian Scientists Titular Member
- 2010 American Geophysical Union Excellence in Geophysical Education Award Committee
- 2014 American Geophysical Union International Award
- 2015 Member of the Academia Europaea
- 2016 National Order of Merit
- 2018 Petrus Peregrinus Medal
- 2018 Membre of Académie Royale de Belgique
- 2018 Membre of Russian Academy of Science
- 2021 Corresponding Member, Bureau des Longitudes - Académie de Science Paris
- 2022 Fellow of the European Academy of Sciences
- 2022 Emil-Wiechert Medal, Deutsche Geophysikalische Gesellschaft
- 2023 Officier de l’Ordre National du Mérite
- 2024 Dolomieu Medal of the French Academy of Sciences
