= World Digital Magnetic Anomaly Map =

The World Digital Magnetic Anomaly Map (WDMAM) was first made available by the Commission for the Geological Map of the World in 2007. Compiled with data from governments and institutes, the project was coordinated by the International Association of Geomagnetism and Aeronomy, and was presented by Mike Purucker of NASA and Colin Reeves of the Netherlands. As of 2007, it was considered to be "the first truly global compilation of lithospheric magnetic field observations." and further improvements dated to 2009 relate to the full spectrum magnetic anomaly grid of the United States and also data of global marine magnetic anomaly.

Some of the magnetic anomalies shown in the WDMAM generally relates to the altitude level of 5 kilometres (3.1 mi). Some of the significant features represented are of the Bangui Anomaly in the Central African Republic, the Chicxulub crater, the Thromsberg anomaly, the Richat Structure, the Atlantic ridge, the Bay of Biscay, the Sunda Arc and the Paris Basin.

== Background ==
=== WDMAM v1, 2007 ===
In evolving the WDMAM the lithospheric data related to data acquired from satellites, data of aero-magnetic survey and marine survey, in-situ data gathered from field stations and observatories are to be collated analyzed together, and this would need an international joint effort.

The map is the product of years of work, research and coordination by the International Association of Geomagnetism and Aeronomy (IAGA) and numerous small organizations around the world including GETECH, a project of Leeds University, and Juha Korhonen of the Geological Survey of Finland have also been involved. International collaboration has been the key to the project. Mike Purucker of NASA said of the collaboration: "There are literally hundreds, perhaps thousands, of organisations around the world which hold this kind of data. One should not underestimate the diplomatic efforts needed to secure support and data contributions from these organizations." Diplomacy was needed to acquire data from the Russians, Indians, and Argentinians and so on. It is available through the Commission for the Geological Map of the World.

The map is compiled from a jigsaw of aeromagnetic surveys, incorporating both ground-based, airborne and marine magnetic data, but is incomplete. CHAMP, a German and Russian-built satellite which has been in orbit since 2001, has been of crucial importance to the map compilers. One of its principal achievements is that it has significantly improved the "pre-processing and the corrections applied to the CHAMP satellite measurements in order to obtain 'clean' satellite data compatible with ground data." However, it has some large gaps in data, which is a hindrance to studying trans-national tectonics, and could benefit from further satellite observational additions to improve its coverage.

Several different models were put forward as candidates for WDMAM by groups from NASA, Leeds University, the Geological Survey of Finland, National Geophysical Data Center (NGDC) and GeoForschungszentrum Potsdam, all using the same base data. Following a review, the NGDC candidate was chosen to form the basemap.

Specified to a grid of three arcminutes, the WDMAM v1 was based on the NGDC's EMAG3 (Earth Magnetic Anomaly Grid, 3 arcminute) dataset. The EMAG has since been improved into EMAG2 at a resolution of two arcminutes and fitted into the Enhanced Magnetic Model.

== Composition ==
According to the BBC, the "global map shows the variation in strength of the magnetic field after the Earth's dipole field has been removed (Earth's dipole field varies from 35,000 nano-Tesla (nT) at the Equator to 70,000 nT at the poles). After removal of the dipole field, the remaining variations in the field (few hundreds of nT) are due to changes in the magnetic properties of the crustal rocks." The map is graphically represented by illustrating those landmarks of high magnetism in red to yellow hues and those of lower or negative magnetism in blue hues. It can pick up numerous aspects of the earth composition, including the sea floor spreading under the oceans, and reserve deposits like iron ore at Kursk. It identifies some prominent magnetic anomalies on the African continent. The dominant factors for magnetic anomalies picked up on the map are "the thickness of the magnetised layer and the composition of the crust". Younger crust is typically thinner, and naturally has a lower number of magnetic materials.

== Bibliography ==
- Flechtner, Frank (2010). System Earth Via Geodetic-geophysical Space Techniques. Heidelberg: Springer. ISBN 978-3-642-10228-8.

== External references ==
- Official website
- WDMAM download page
