= Czira =

Czira is a surname. Notable people with the surname include:

- Sidney Czira (1889–1974), Irish journalist, broadcaster, writer, and revolutionary
- Szabolcs Czira (born 1951), Hungarian politician
