= Geology of the Central African Republic =

The geology of Central African Republic (CAR) is part of the broader geology of Africa. CAR occupies a swath of ancient rocks, dating back billions of years that record significant aspects of Earth history and yield minerals vital to the country's small economy.

== Geologic history ==
Southern CAR is part of the Congo Craton, a stable landmass dating to the Archean that was once fused with the Sao Francisco Craton until the opening of the South Atlantic Ocean. Some of the oldest rocks in CAR belong to the 3.4 billion year old Bomu Complex which includes migmatite gneiss and metasedimentary schist spanning from the Democratic Republic of Congo. The Congo Craton once functioned as a small continent, until it was joined with Siberia during the formation of the supercontinent Columbia, between 2.1 and 1.8 billion years ago. A string of large igneous province (LIP) volcanic events took place in three pulses during the time that the craton was part of Columbia, until the supercontinent fragmented. The Congo Craton was subsequently joined to the supercontinent Rodinia between 1.3 billion and 750 million years ago after a period where it may have existed as a separate continent in the Southern Hemisphere. At the time, the continent was entirely barren with no land life and the region experienced large scale glaciation during the Cryogenian Period.

The northern part of the country is grouped with the Saharan Metacraton, which began to form between 3 billion and 2 billion years ago and accelerated with the Pan-African Orogeny and the creation of the Oubangides Belt in the Neoproterozoic. After the breakup of Rodinia, modern CAR was situated near the center of the subsequent supercontinent Pannotia, as part of the fully assembled basement rock of the current African continent. The region existed in the Southern Hemisphere as part of the supercontinents Gondwana and Pangaea.

Many aspects of Central African Republic's geologic history remain unknown. Along with the Brazilian state of Bahia, CAR is the only country known to host carbonados (black diamond aggregates), which some researchers have suggested may be connected to a Precambrian meteorite impact that could also have generated the Bangui magnetic anomaly.

== Bedrock geology ==
Up to 60% of bedrock beneath the Central African Republic dates to the Precambrian. Much of the country is situated in the Archean Congo Craton. The North Equatorial Fold Belt, Pan-African granulites and greenstone belts are found in the north and center of the country. Cretaceous sandstones span the west and central areas of the republic. The Bakouma Formation includes extensive carbonates, glacial outwash and tillite deposits dated to the Neoproterozoic.

Stratigraphically, the lower units of Precambrian rock are granite, amphibolite, gneiss and gneissic-migmatite rock, likely dating to the Neoarchean. These sequences, divided into the Bandas Belt and Dekoa Belt, are often described as a greenstone belt. Granitoid batholiths and dolerite dikes dating to the Proterozoic frequently intrude into these layers. The upper sequence is Neoproterozoic age quartzite and schist and tends to be folded, but only weakly metamorphosed. In the west, the Mambere Formation and the Kombele Formation in the east each record glacial sediments, while erosion and river activity left behind the Cretaceous Mouaka-Ouadda and Carnot-Berberati sandstone formations, as well as the plateaus of the Eocene Bambio Sandstone. During the Quaternary extensive weathering of surface rocks took place, up to 40 meters deep.

== Surficial geology and soils ==
Iron-rich plinthosols dominate most of the center of the country. Unconsolidated psamment deposits (also known as arenosols) occupy a section of the west and center of the country along with soils grouped under the FAO ferralsol classification of iron and aluminium-rich soils. Hydric, grayish-blue wetland gleysols are found in small locations in the north and along the border with the Congo.

== Bibliography and further reading ==
- Soto-Viruet, Yadira (2010). The Mineral Industries of Central African Republic, Cote D'Ivoire, and Togo (PDF). US Geological Survey.
- Rocks for Crops: Central African Republic (PDF). University of Guelph. Archived from the original (PDF) on 2016-03-03.
- Schluter, Thomas (2008). Geological Atlas of Africa. Springer. ISBN 9783540763734.
- "Hydrogeology of Central African Republic".
