= Magnetic anomaly detector =

Instrument for detecting variations in the Earth's magnetic field

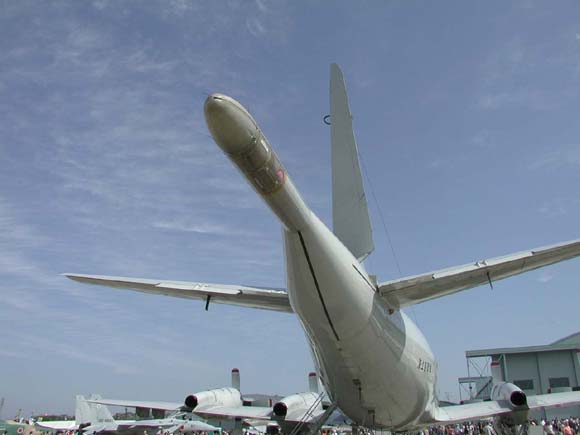
MAD rear boom on P-3C

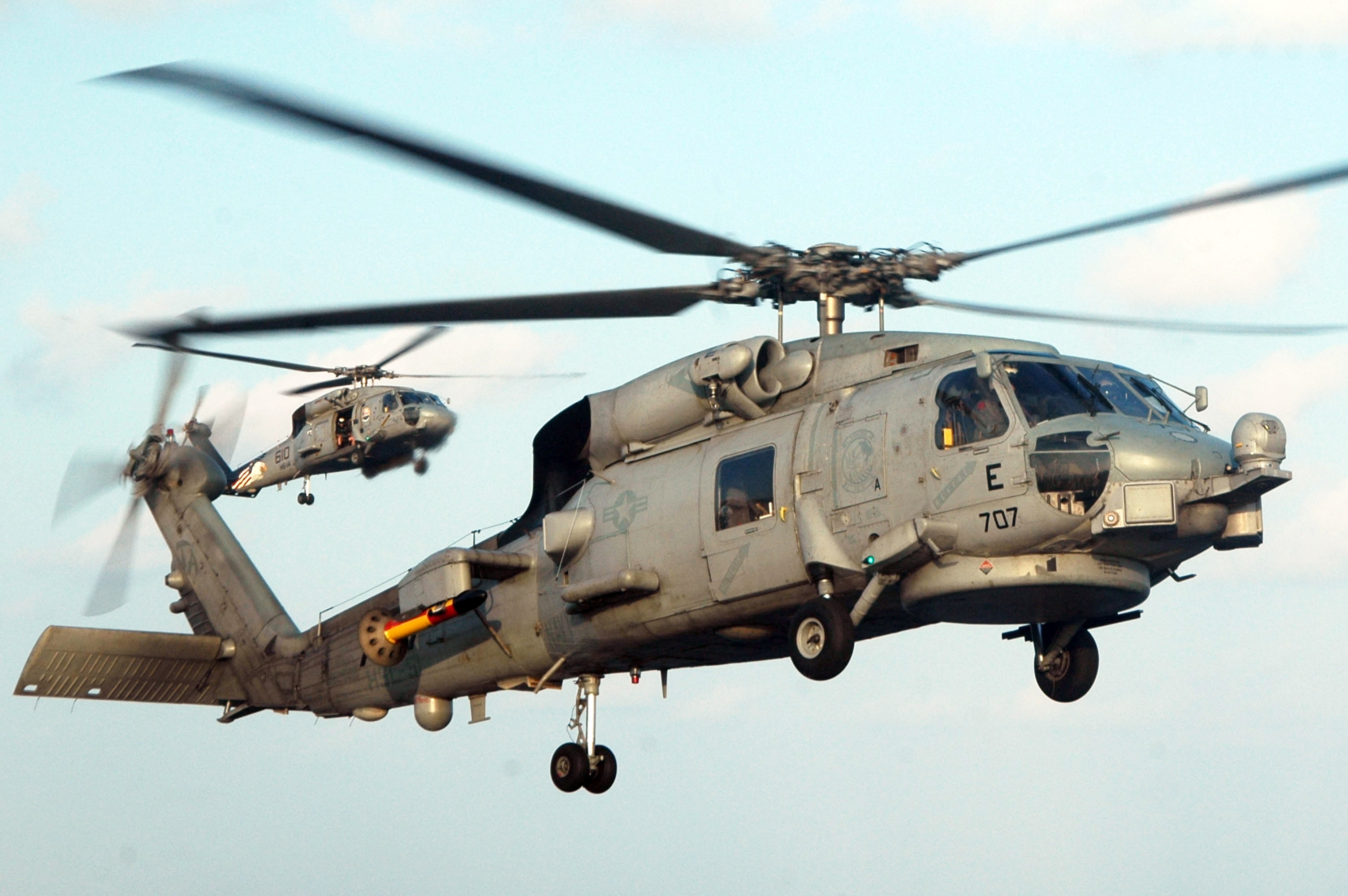
The SH-60B Seahawk helicopter carries a yellow and red towed MAD array known as a "MAD bird", seen on the aft fuselage

A magnetic anomaly detector (MAD) is an instrument used to detect minute variations in the Earth's magnetic field. The term typically refers to magnetometers used by military forces to detect submarines (a mass of ferromagnetic material creates a detectable disturbance in the magnetic field). Military MAD equipment is a descendant of geomagnetic survey or aeromagnetic survey instruments used to search for minerals by detecting their disturbance of the normal earth-field.

== History ==
Geoexploration by measuring and studying variations in the Earth's magnetic field has been conducted by scientists since 1843. The first uses of magnetometers were for the location of ore deposits. Thalen's "The Examination of Iron Ore Deposits by Magnetic Measurements", published in 1879, was the first scientific treatise describing this practical use.

Magnetic anomaly detectors employed to detect submarines during World War II harnessed the fluxgate magnetometer, an inexpensive and easy to use technology developed in the 1930s by Victor Vacquier of Gulf Oil for finding ore deposits. MAD gear was used by both Japanese and U.S. anti-submarine forces, either towed by ship or mounted in aircraft to detect shallow submerged enemy submarines. The Japanese called the technology jikitanchiki (磁気探知機, "Magnetic Detector"). After the war, the U.S. Navy continued to develop MAD gear as a parallel development with sonar detection technologies.

Satellite, near-surface and oceanic data from detectors was used to create the World Digital Magnetic Anomaly Map published by the Commission for the Geological Map of the World (CGMW) in July 2007.

== Operation ==
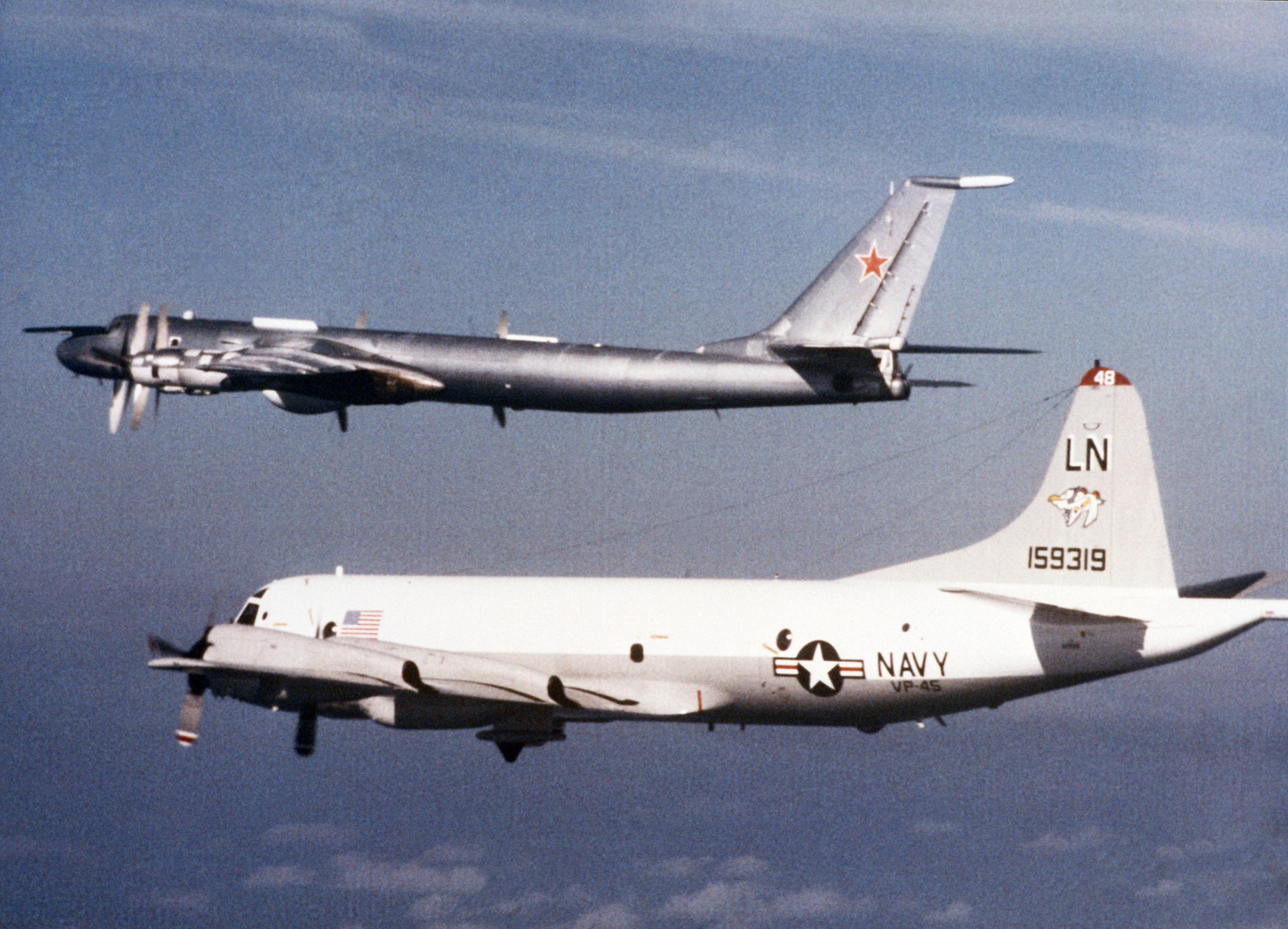
A Soviet Tu-142MK (with MAD located in aft-facing fin-top fairing) escorted by US Navy Lockheed P-3C (MAD located in projection at base of tail), March 1986

The magnetic anomaly from a submarine is usually very small. One source estimates that it is only about 0.2 nT at a distance of 600 m. Another source estimates that a 100 m long and 10 m wide submarine would produce a magnetic flux of 13.33 nT at 500 m, 1.65 nT at 1 km and 0.01 nT at 5 km. To reduce interference from electrical equipment or metal in the fuselage of the aircraft, the MAD sensor is placed at the end of a boom or on a towed aerodynamic device. Even so, the submarine must be very near the aircraft's position and close to the sea surface for detection of the anomaly, because magnetic fields decrease as the inverse cube of distance, one source gives a detection slant range of 500 m. The size of the submarine, its hull composition and orientation, as well as the water depth and complexity of the natural magnetic field, determine the detection range. MAD devices are usually mounted on aircraft. For example, one study showed that a horizontal detection range of 450–800 m, when aircraft was 200 m above a submarine, decreased to less than 150 m when the aircraft was 400 m above the submarine.

If the sea floor has sunken ships, then submarines may operate near them to confuse magnetic anomaly detectors.

MAD has certain advantages over other detection methods. It is a passive detection method. Unlike sonar it is not affected by meteorological conditions; indeed above sea state 5, MAD may be the only reliable method for submarine detection.

Modern day MAD systems incorporate digital signal processing greatly to increase detection accuracy. Contemporary approaches are commonly grouped into two categories: target-based methods, which generally model a ferromagnetic object as a magnetic dipole, and noise-based methods, which use statistical analysis to identify anomalies as deviations from the background geomagnetic field. In many target-based schemes, the measured anomaly is expanded in orthogonal basis functions (OBFs) that work by using the dipole model. OBF decomposition works by expanding the measured field into an orthogonal basis derived from dipole theory in which a detection statistic is constructed from the energy of the expansion coefficient, enhancing the signal-to-noise ratio for weak magnetic anomalies.

== Other uses ==
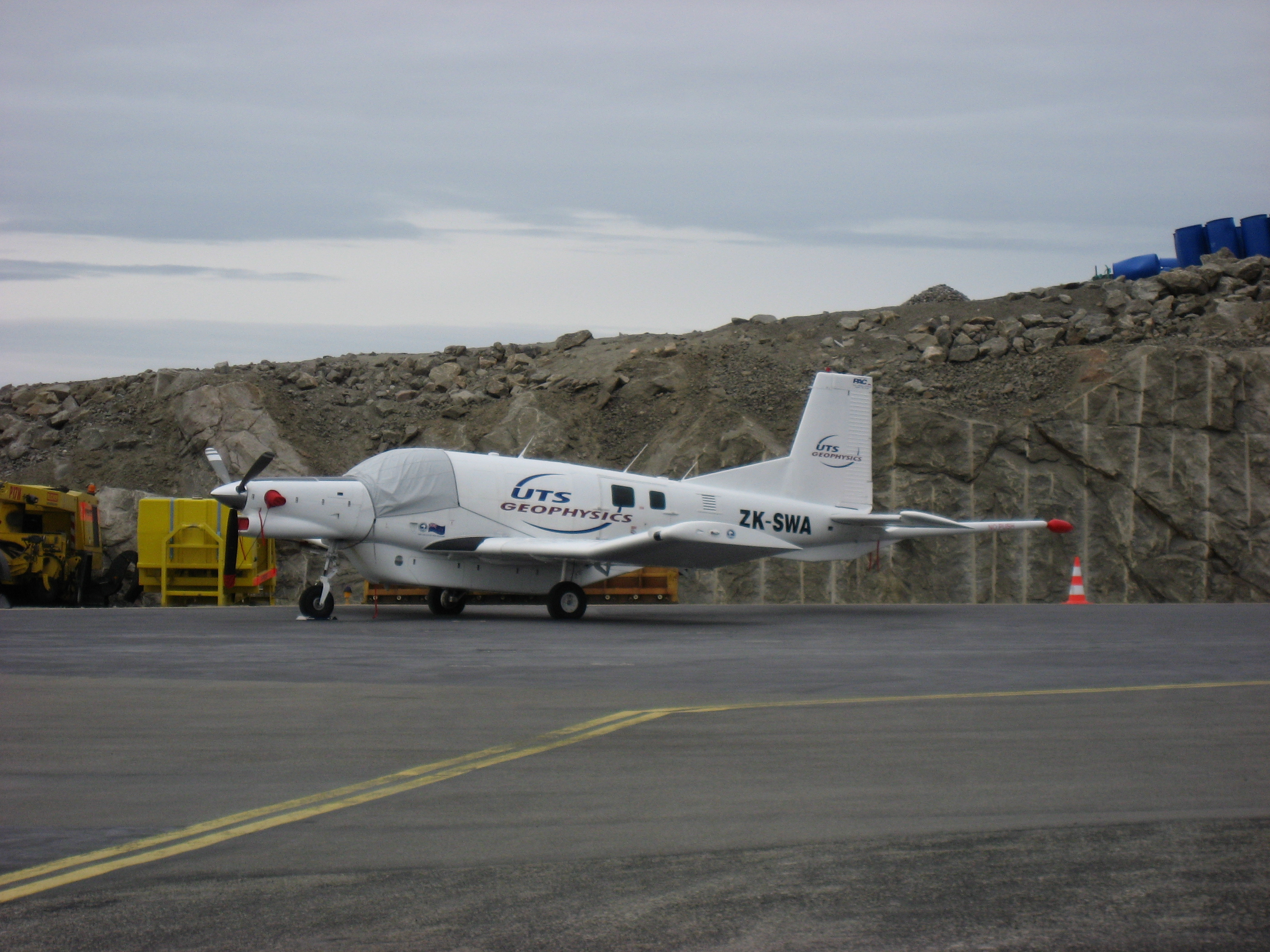
PAC P-750 XSTOL geosurvey aircraft with a MAD stinger in Upernavik, Greenland

For aeromagnetic survey applications the magnetic sensor can be mounted on an aircraft (typically on a long probe in front of or behind the aircraft to reduce the magnetic effects of the aircraft itself) or in a towed device. A chart is produced that geologists and geophysicists can study to determine the distribution and concentration of magnetic minerals which are related to geology and mineral deposits.

== See also ==
- Submarine detection system
- Autolycus, exhaust plume detector
