= Annual cycle =

Yearly events

An annual cycle refers to a set of changes or events that uniformly, or consistently, take place at the same time of year.

In biology, the annual cycle for plants and animals details behavioral and chemical changes that take place as the seasons advance.

In business, a business cycle refers to the way modelling and analysis is applied to the periodic development and marketing of new products and services.

In religion, the annual cycle refers to the various celebrations or memorials that occur in the same sequence from year to year. For example, in Christianity the liturgical year is an annual cycle, which for some Christian denominations is composed of the temporal cycle that tracks the events in the life of Christ, and the sanctoral cycle which tracks the various saint's days. Some Christian churches only observe the temporal cycle.

In climatology, an annual cycle is the part of a measured quantity's fluctuation that is attributed to Earth's changing position in orbit over the course of the year. Such quantities might be influenced directly (e.g. incoming solar radiation at a point at the surface) or indirectly (e.g. stratospheric westerlies and easterlies over the winter and summer hemispheres, respectively) by orbital position.

Mathematically, the climatological annual cycle is commonly estimated from observational data or model output by taking the average of all Januaries, all Februaries, and so forth. If the observational record is long enough and conditions are stationary (i.e. there is no significant long-term trend), a meaningful annual cycle will result that can be used to calculate an anomaly time series.
