= Johann Koenigsberger =

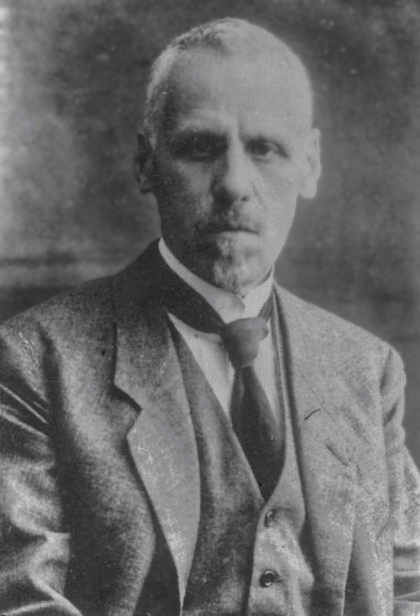
- Born: 7 May 1874; Heidelberg, Germany
- Died: 3 December 1946 (aged 72); Freiburg im Breisgau, Germany
- Education: University of Berlin (Ph.D., 1897)
- Known for: Koenigsberger ratio
- Spouse(s): Emilie Heckmann, Magdalene Müller
- Children: 1
- Scientific career
- Fields: Physics, Mineralogy
- Workplaces: University of Freiburg

Johann Georg Koenigsberger (May 7, 1874 – December 3, 1946) was a German physicist, mineralogist, and member of the Landtag of the Republic of Baden.

== Life ==
Johann Koenigsberger was born to mathematician Leo Koenigsberger and his wife, Sophie Kappel, and grew up with his two years younger sister, Ani Koenigsberger. After attending high school in Heidelberg, he studied natural sciences and mathematics from 1892 to 1897 in Heidelberg, Berlin, and Freiburg. In 1897, he earned his doctorate in Berlin and worked as an assistant at the Physics Institute in Freiburg. Three years later, he completed his habilitation in Freiburg and subsequently served as an associate professor of mathematical physics from 1904 to 1935. As a wartime volunteer from 1914 to 1916, he was awarded the Iron Cross, 2nd Class, before being discharged due to hearing damage. Koenigsberger was also politically active, representing the Social Democratic Party (SPD) in the Landtag of the Republic of Baden from 1919 to 1921.

Because Koenigsberger was both a republican member of the Baden parliament and of Jewish descent, he was suspended from his professorship in 1933 and dismissed from the University of Freiburg in 1934. After the end of the Nazi dictatorship, he was reinstated as a professor in 1946 and continued his theoretical research under difficult conditions until his death.

Koenigsberger was particularly known for his work on the magnetic properties of minerals. In his honor, the ratio of remanent to induced magnetization, which he first described, became known as the Koenigsberger ratio.

Koenigsberger was Protestant and married twice, first in 1909 to Emilie Heckmann (1882–1923), with whom he had a daughter, and second in 1925 to Magdalene Müller (1897–1967).
