= Frigyes Hegedűs =

Hungarian modern pentathlete

Personal information
- Born: 14 May 1920 Nagykőrös, Hungary
- Died: 1 June 2008 (aged 88)

Sport
- Sport: Modern pentathlon

Frigyes Hegedűs (14 May 1920 – 1 June 2008) was a Hungarian modern pentathlete. He competed at the 1948 Summer Olympics.
