= János Zatykó =

Hungarian agrarian engineer and politician

Mayor of Komárom
- In office 25 April 1999 – 3 October 2010
- Preceded by: Gyula Krajczár
- Succeeded by: Attila Molnár

Member of the National Assembly
- In office 28 June 1994 – 13 May 2010

Personal details
- Born: 12 February 1948 (age 78) Nagykőrös, Hungary
- Party: MSZP (since 1996)
- Other political affiliations: MSZMP (1979–1989)
- Profession: agrarian engineer, politician

János Zatykó (born 12 February 1948) is a Hungarian agrarian engineer and politician, member of the National Assembly (MP) for Komárom (Komárom-Esztergom County Constituency IV) from 1994 to 2010. He also served as mayor of Komárom between 25 April 1999 and 3 October 2010.

Zatykó was a member of the Hungarian Socialist Workers' Party (MSZMP) between 1979 and 1989. After the end of Communism in Hungary, he became a non-partisan politician. He was elected MP for Komárom for the first time in the 1994 parliamentary election. He joined the Hungarian Socialist Party (MSZP) on 1 July 1996. He was a member of the Committee on Agriculture from 14 May 1996 to 13 May 2010. Zatykó was elected mayor of Komárom during a by-election which was held after the sudden death of the previous mayor Gyula Krajczár.

Political offices
Preceded by Gyula Krajczár	Mayor of Komárom; 1999–2010	Succeeded by Attila Molnár
