= Koenigsberger ratio =

The Koenigsberger ratio is the proportion of remanent magnetization relative to induced magnetization in natural rocks. It was first described by J.G. Koenigsberger. It is a dimensionless parameter often used in geophysical exploration to describe the magnetic characteristics of a geological body for help in interpreting magnetic anomaly patterns.

$Q = \frac{M_{rem}}{M_{ind}}= \frac{M_{rem}}{\chi H}$

Definition
Q	Koenigsberger ratio
$M_{rem}$	remanent magnetization
$M_{ind}$	induced magnetization
χ	the magnetic susceptibility; the influence of an applied magnetic field on a material
H	the macroscopic magnetic field

The total magnetization of a rock is the sum of its natural remanent magnetization and the magnetization induced by the ambient geomagnetic field. Thus, a Koenigsberger ratio, Q, greater than 1 indicates that the remanence properties contribute the majority of the total magnetization of the rock.
