= Nagykőrös =

- Town
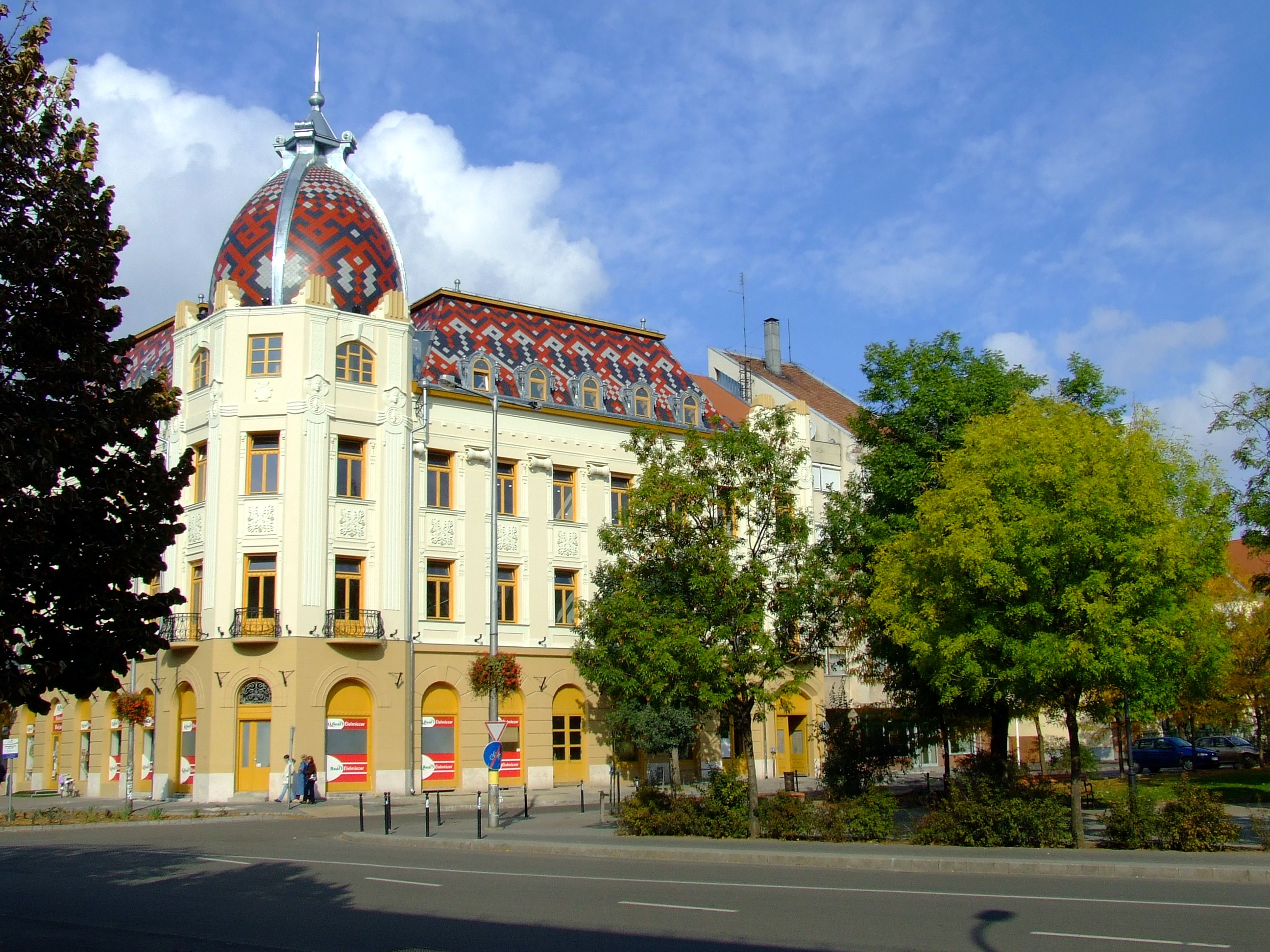
- Szabadság Square

- Flag Coat of arms

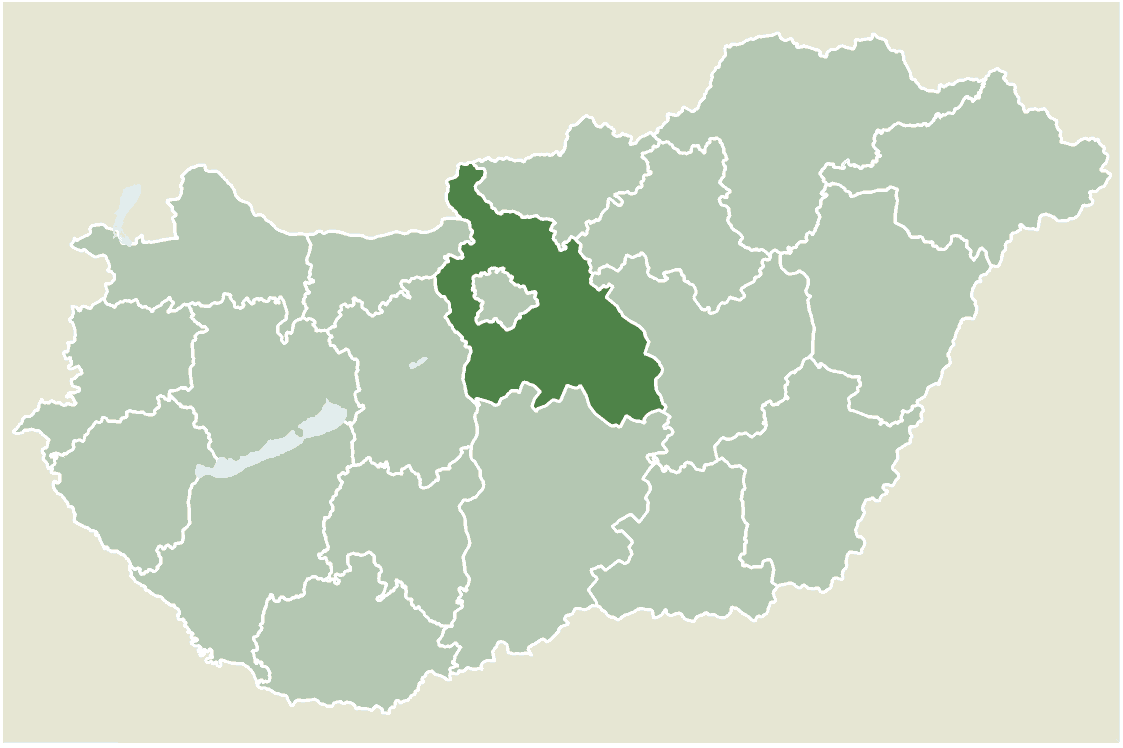
- Location of Pest county in Hungary

- Location of Nagykőrös
- Coordinates: 47.033182°N 19.783981°E
- Country: Hungary
- County: Pest
- District: Nagykőrös

Area
  - Total: 227.96 km^{2} (88.02 sq mi)

Population (2019)
  - Total: 23,517
  - Density: 112.72/km^{2} (291.9/sq mi)
- Time zone: UTC+1 (CET)
  - Summer (DST): UTC+2 (CEST)
- Postal code: 2750
- Area code: (+36) 53
- Website: www.nagykoros.hu

Nagykőrös is a town in Pest County, Hungary.

János Arany taught there from about 1851, and a local museum is named for him.

== Notable people ==
- Szabolcs Czira (b. 1951), politician
- Frigyes Hegedűs (1920–2008), pentathlete
- István Kecskés (b. 1980), boxer
- István Reszeli Soós (1962–2015), football manager
- Mór Réthy (1846–1925), mathematician
- János Zatykó (b. 1948), agrarian engineer and politician

== Twin towns — sister cities ==
Nagykőrös is twinned with:

- Castrocaro Terme e Terra del Sole, Italy
- Espelkamp, Germany
- Haaksbergen, Netherlands
- Reghin, Romania
- Salonta, Romania
