= Leo Koenigsberger =

German mathematician, historian and biographer

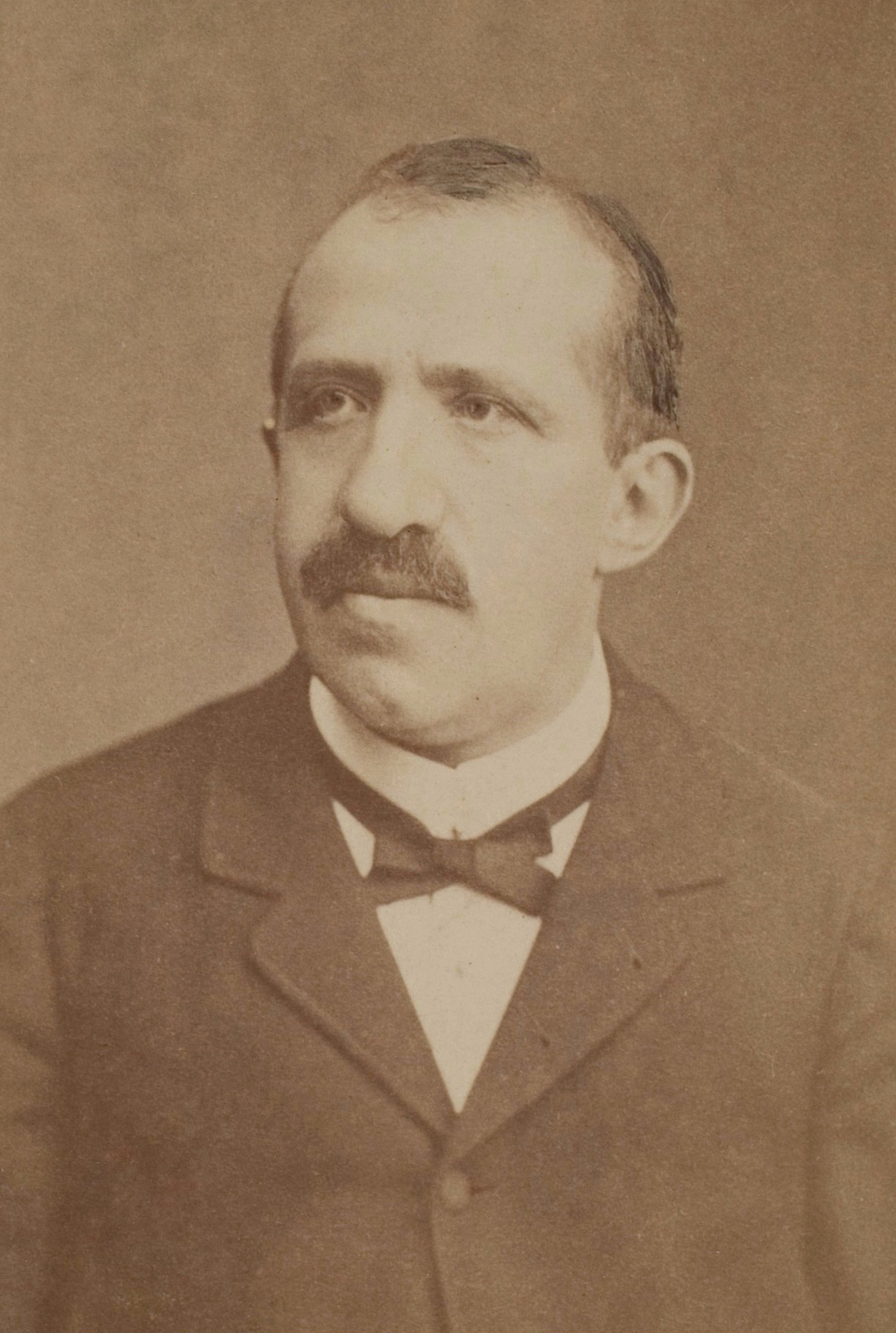
- Photograph of Koenigsberger, 1886
- Born: 15 October 1837; Posen, Kingdom of Prussia
- Died: 15 December 1921 (aged 84); Heidelberg, Weimar Germany
- Education: University of Berlin (Ph.D., 1860)
- Children: 2, including Johann
- Scientific career
- Fields: Mathematics
- Workplaces: University of Heidelberg; University of Vienna
- Thesis: De motu puncti versus duo fixa centra attracti (1860)
- Doctoral advisor: Ernst Kummer; Karl Weierstrass
- Doctoral students: Karl Bopp; Jakob Horn; Edmund Husserl; Gyula Kőnig; Martin Krause; Gustav Mie; Max Noether; Georg Alexander Pick; Alfred Pringsheim; Mór Réthy; Max Wolf

Leo Koenigsberger (15 October 1837 – 15 December 1921) was a German mathematician and historian of science. He is best known for his three-volume biography of Hermann von Helmholtz, which remains the standard reference on the subject.

== Biography ==
Leo Koenigsberger was born in 1837 in Posen (now Poznań, Poland) to the wealthy merchant Jakob Löb (1800–1882) and Henriette Kantorowicz (1810–1895) and had eleven siblings. He studied at the University of Berlin with Karl Weierstrass, where he taught mathematics and physics (1860–64). He taught at the University of Greifswald (assistant professor, 1864–66; professor, 1866–69), the University of Heidelberg (1869–75), the Technische Universität Dresden (1875–77), and the University of Vienna (1877–84) before returning to Heidelberg in 1884, where remained until his retirement in 1914.

Whilst at Heidelberg, he was elected to honorary membership of the Manchester Literary and Philosophical Society on 17 April 1895.

In 1904 he was a Plenary Speaker of the ICM in Heidelberg. In 1919 he published his autobiography, Mein Leben ('My Life'). The biography of Helmholtz was published in 1902 and 1903. He also wrote a biography of C. G. J. Jacobi.

Koenigsberger's own research was primarily on elliptic functions and differential equations. He worked closely with Lazarus Fuchs, a childhood friend.

In 1873, he married in Heidelberg Sophie Beral-Kappel, daughter of the merchant Iwanowitsch Beral of Kharkov and Anna Grigoriewna Tschaikowski. They had a son and a daughter, Johann Koenigsberger (1874), professor of physics in Freiburg, and Ani Koenigsberger (1876).

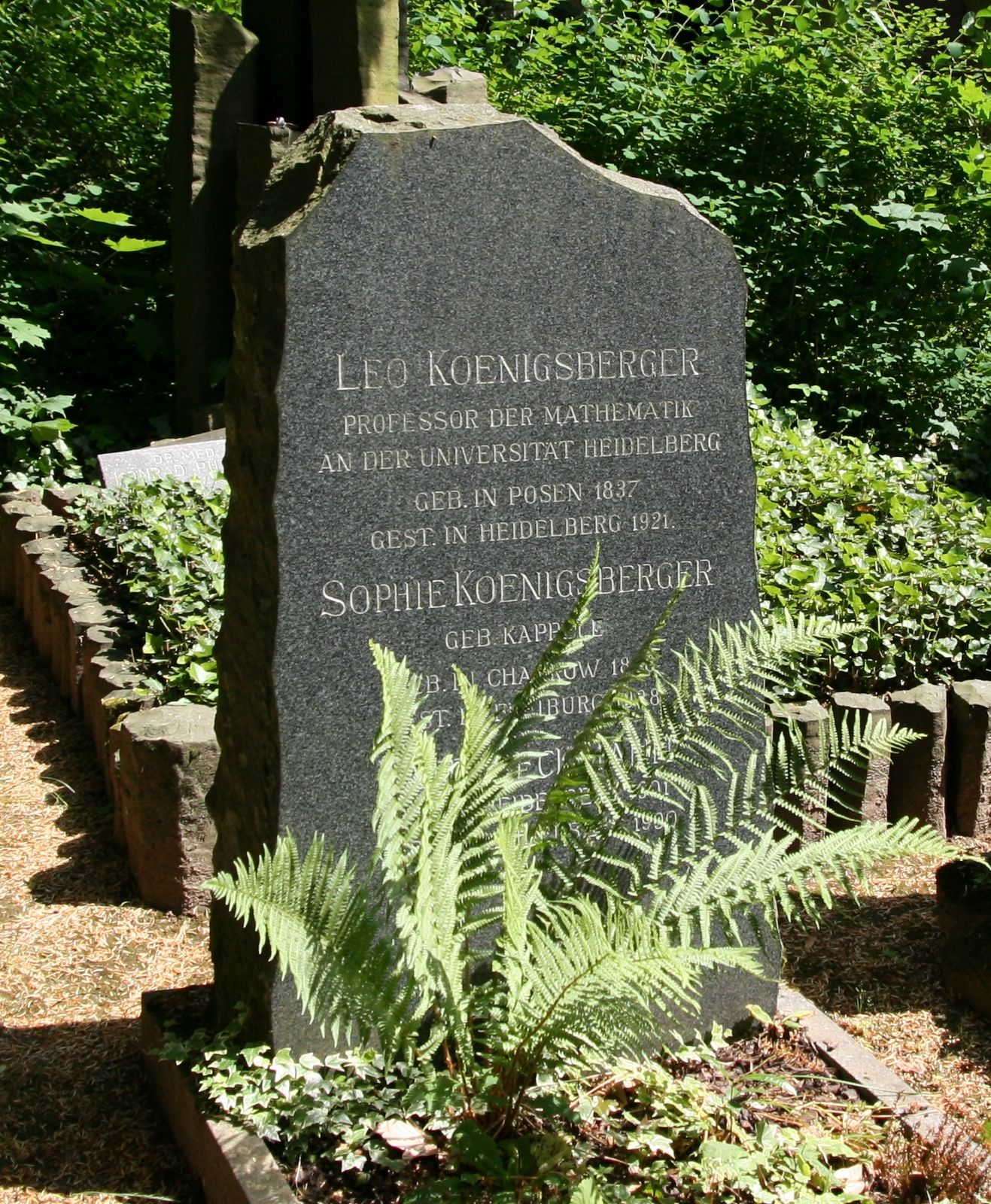
His grave in Heidelberg

== Selected publications ==
- Vorlesungen über die Theorie der elliptischen Functionen, nebst einer Einleitung in die allgemeine Functionenlehre
- Vorlesungen über die Theorie der hyperelliptischen Integrale, Teubner 1878, Project Gutenberg
- Allgemeine Üntersuchungen aus der Theorie der Differentialgleichungen
- Lehrbuch der Theorie der Differentialgleichungen mit einer unabhängigen Variabeln
- Zur Geschichte der Theorie der elliptischen Transcendenten in den Jahren 1826–29, Teubner 1879, Project Gutenberg
- Carl Gustav Jacob Jacobi, Teubner 1904.
- "Gedächtnisrede auf C. G. J. Jacobi von L. Koenigsberger". Verhandlungen des dritten Mathematiker-Kongresses in Heidelberg von 8. bis 13. August 1904. Leipzig: B. G. Teubner. 1905. pp. 57–85.
- Mein Leben, Heidelberg 1919. (Erw. Ausgabe. Univ. Heidelberg 2015.)
