= Mór Réthy =

Hungarian mathematician

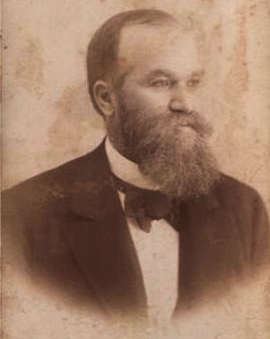
- Born: November 9, 1846; Nagykőrös, Hungary
- Died: October 16, 1925 (aged 78); Budapest, Hungary
- Resting place: Kozma Street Cemetery (Budapest); 47.479499°N 19.179202°E
- Education: University of Heidelberg
- Spouse(s): Etelka Finály (1870-1883); Steiner Johanna (1887-1924); Julianna Schwarcz (1924-1925)
- Scientific career
- Fields: Mathematics; Physics
- Workplaces: University of Kolozsvár; Technical University of Budapest
- Doctoral advisor: Leo Königsberger

Mór Réthy (or Moritz Réthy) (1846–1925) was a Hungarian mathematician.

== Life and work ==
Réthy attended the Technical Universities of Vienna and Budapest; he graduated in Budapest in 1870. After two years teaching in the Modern Technical School of Körmöcbánya, he obtained a grant to follow huis studies in Göttingen and Heidelberg, where he studied under Clebsch, Kirchhoff, Schering and Königsberger, obtaining his doctoral degree in Heidelberg in 1874.

In 1874 he was appointed extraordinary professor at the university of Kolozsvár where he remained until 1886, serving also as head of mathematics department and dean of the faculty of sciences. In 1886 he began teaching in the Technical University of Budapest lecturing in geometry; but then his interest changed to mathematical physics, lecturing in analytical mechanics and theoretical physics from 1892 until his retirement.

Réthy was member of the Hungarian Academy of Sciences (1878), he was awarded an honorary degree from University of Heidelberg (1924). He received the Marczibányi Prize in 1904.

He spread the work of the Bolyai father and son editing the Tentamen in two volumes in 1897 and 1904 and writing papers about it.

Réthy is remembered by his work on theoretical mechanics published mainly in Hungarian or German but translated to English in many cases.

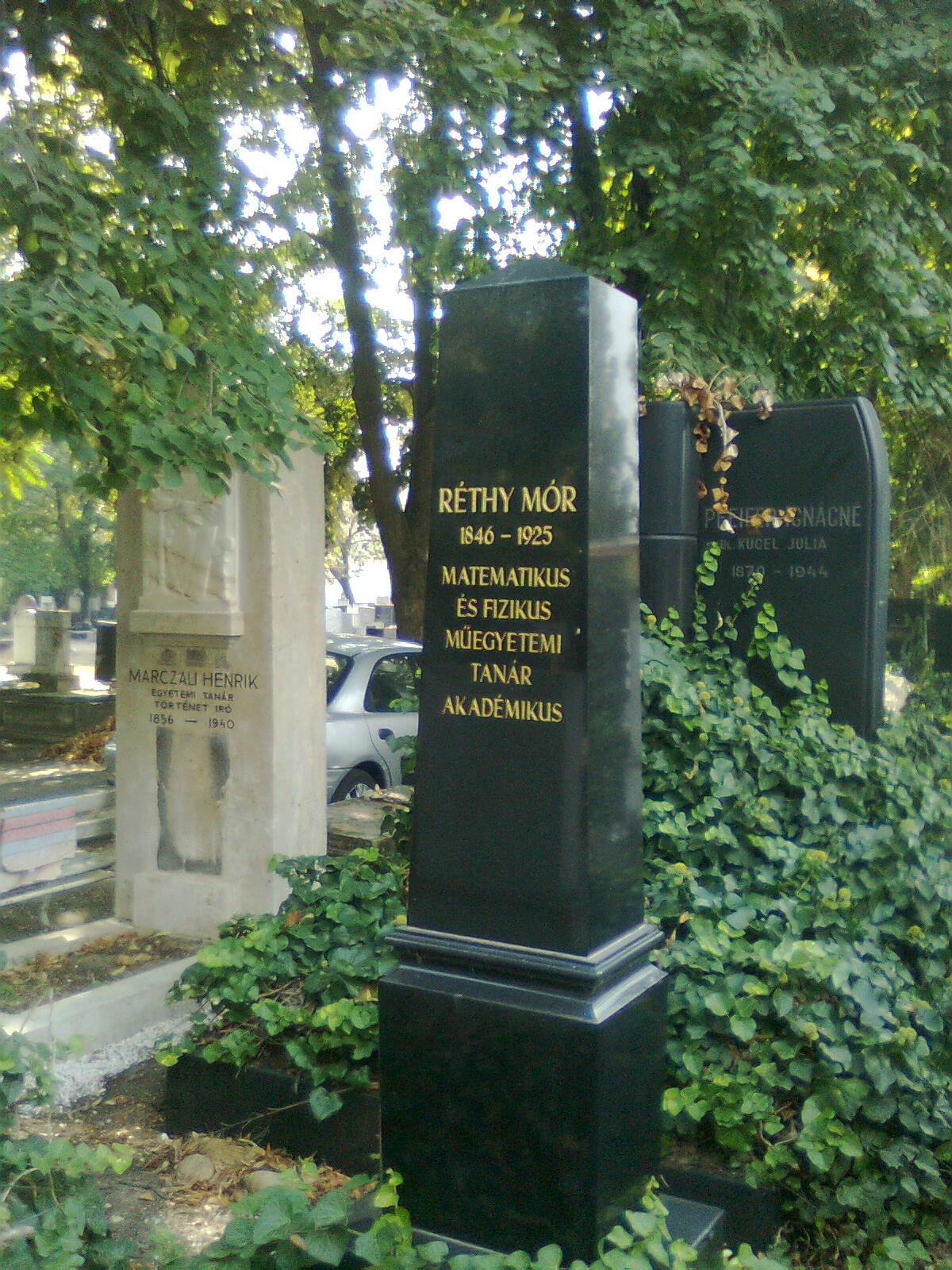
Réthy's burial in Budapest

== Bibliography ==
- Frank, Tibor (2012). "Teaching and Learning Science in Hungary, 1867–1945: Schools, Personalities, Influences". Science & Education. 21 (3): 355–380. doi:10.1007/s11191-011-9344-5. ISSN 0926-7220. S2CID 144178519.
- Horvath, Janos (ed,) (2006). A Panorama of Hungarian Mathematics in the Twentieth Century. Springer. ISBN 978-3-540-28945-6.
- Prékopa, András (2006). "The Revolution of János Bolyai". In András Prékopa; Emil Molnár (eds.). Non-Euclidean Geometries. Springer. ISBN 978-0387-29554-1.
- Szenkovits, Ferenc (2014). "Remarkable Hungarian mathematicians at the Cluj University" (PDF). Mathematica. 59 (4): 419–433. ISSN 2065-961X.
