= Attila Molnár (politician) =

Hungarian politician (born 1971)

Mayor of Komárom
- Incumbent
- Assumed office 3 October 2010
- Preceded by: János Zatykó

Member of the National Assembly
- In office 14 May 2010 – 5 May 2014

Personal details
- Born: 1971 (age 54–55) Mosonmagyaróvár, Hungary
- Party: Fidesz (since 1989)
- Profession: Jurist, politician

Attila Molnár (born 1971) is a Hungarian Fidesz politician who was a member of the National Assembly from the Komárom-Esztergom County Regional List between 2010 and 2014. He is serving as mayor of Komárom since 3 October 2010.

Molnár was a member of the Constitutional, Judicial, and Standing Orders Committee from 14 May 2010 to 5 May 2014 during the second Orbán government and participated in the drawing up of the Fundamental Law of Hungary in 2011.

== Personal life ==
Molnár is married and has one child.

Political offices
Preceded by János Zatykó	Mayor of Komárom; 2010–	Succeeded by Incumbent
