= István Reszeli Soós =

Hungarian football manager

Personal information
- Date of birth: 14 August 1962
- Place of birth: Nagykőrös, Hungary
- Date of death: 21 March 2015 (aged 52)
- Place of death: Nagykőrös, Hungary

Managerial career
- Years: Team
- 1989–1993: Dorog
- 1993–1995: Tiszakécske
- 1995–1996: Keszthely
- 1996–1997: Paks
- 1997–1999: Győr
- 1999–2000: Honvéd
- 2000–2001: Sopron
- 2003–2004: Győr
- 2007: Győr

István Reszeli Soós (born 14 August 1962, died 21 March 2015) was a Hungarian professional football manager and former player.

== Managerial career ==
=== Győr ===
He debuted on 25 July 1998 with a draw against Gázszer FC in the 1998–99 Nemzeti Bajnokság I season. His last match was a 1-0 victory over MTK Budapest FC on 16 June 2000.

=== Honvéd ===
Between 1999 and 2000, he managed Budapest Honvéd FC. On 10 September 1999, he debuted with a 5-1 victory over Vác FC in the 1999–2000 Nemzeti Bajnokság I season. His last match was on 20 May 2000 against Győri ETO FC. The match ended with a 4-0 defeat at Stadion ETO.

=== Sopron ===
Between 2000 and 2001, he managed FC Sopron.

He filed a case against his former club; however, he lost the case.

=== Győr ===
From November 2003, he worked as a sport director for Győr. On 25 September 2004, his team, győr, played against Diósgyőri VTK at the Diósgyőri Stadion; however, he was hesitating to sit on the bench during the match since he was afraid of the fans of Diósgyőr.

== Personal life ==
From 2009, he moved back to his hometown, Nagykőrös, and spent his final years there.

== Death ==
On 21 March 2015, he died in his home after a long illness. He was buried in his hometown, Nagykőrös on 10 April 2015. His former player, Ottó Vince, represented his former club Győri ETO FC at the funeral.
