= Gyula Krajczár =

Hungarian politician

Mayor of Komárom
- In office 1990–1998
- Preceded by: first
- Succeeded by: János Zatykó

Personal details
- Born: 1953
- Died: 1998 (aged 44–45)
- Party: MSZP
- Profession: politician

Dr. Gyula Krajczár (1953–1998) was a Hungarian politician, who served as mayor of Komárom from 1990 to 1998. He was elected mayor for the third term on October 18, 1998, however he died soon that year. He was replaced by János Zatykó during a by-election in 1999.

Political offices
Preceded by first	Mayor of Komárom; 1990–1998	Succeeded by János Zatykó
