= Kursk Magnetic Anomaly =

Magnetic anomaly in Russia due to extensive presence of iron ore

Coordinates: 51°15′13″N 37°40′10″E

Oblasts comprising Central Black Earth Region

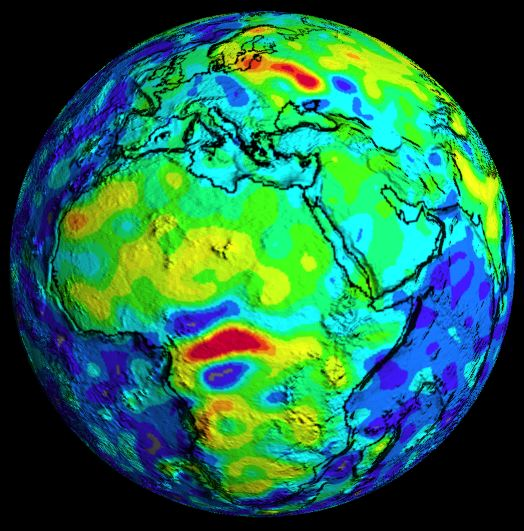
Magnetic intensity from satellite data. The Kursk anomaly is the high-intensity (red) anomaly in the north while the Bangui anomaly is the one in central Africa.

The Kursk Magnetic Anomaly (Russian: Курская магнитная аномалия) is recognized as the largest magnetic anomaly on Earth. It is a territory rich in iron ores located within the Kursk, Belgorod, and Voronezh oblasts in Russia, and constitutes a significant part of the Central Black Earth Region.

The Kursk Magnetic Anomaly (KMA) was first discovered in 1773 by the Russian astronomer and academic Pyotr Inokhodtsev while preparing the maps of the General Land Survey (Russian: Генеральное межевание) at the behest of the Russian government. It was not investigated again until 1874 when I. N. Smirnov conducted the first geomagnetic survey of European Russia. In 1883, N. D. Pilchikov, an assistant professor at Kharkiv University, conducted a series of 71 observations of the Kursk Magnetic Anomaly. These revealed a much larger extent than previously measured and for the first time attributed the anomaly to the presence of iron ore. In 1884, on the basis of this discovery, Pilchikov was awarded the silver medal of the Russian Geographical Society.

Serious investigation of the economic potential of the anomaly occurred under the leadership of Ivan Gubkin in 1920–1925, originally based upon the possibilities for oil. Rich ores were discovered in the region of the anomaly about 1931. The ores are spread over an area estimated at 120,000 km^{2} (46,000 sq mi) and are magnetite quartzites disseminated throughout metamorphic rocks and Pre-Cambrian granitoids. Surveyed ore reserves of ferrous quartzite are presently estimated at more than 25 billion tonnes (28 billion short tons) of 32–37% Fe and more than 30 billion tonnes (33 billion short tons) of 52–66% Fe. The open pit method is used to mine this ore at the Stoylenskoye, Lebedinskoye, and Mikhailovskoye deposits. Underground mining methods are used for the Korobkovskoye deposit.

== See also ==
- Stoilensky GOK
- Bangui magnetic anomaly
- Temagami Magnetic Anomaly
- Ishpatina Ridge
