= Temagami Magnetic Anomaly =

Magnetic anomaly in Ontario, Canada

Coordinates: 47.0°N 80.2°W

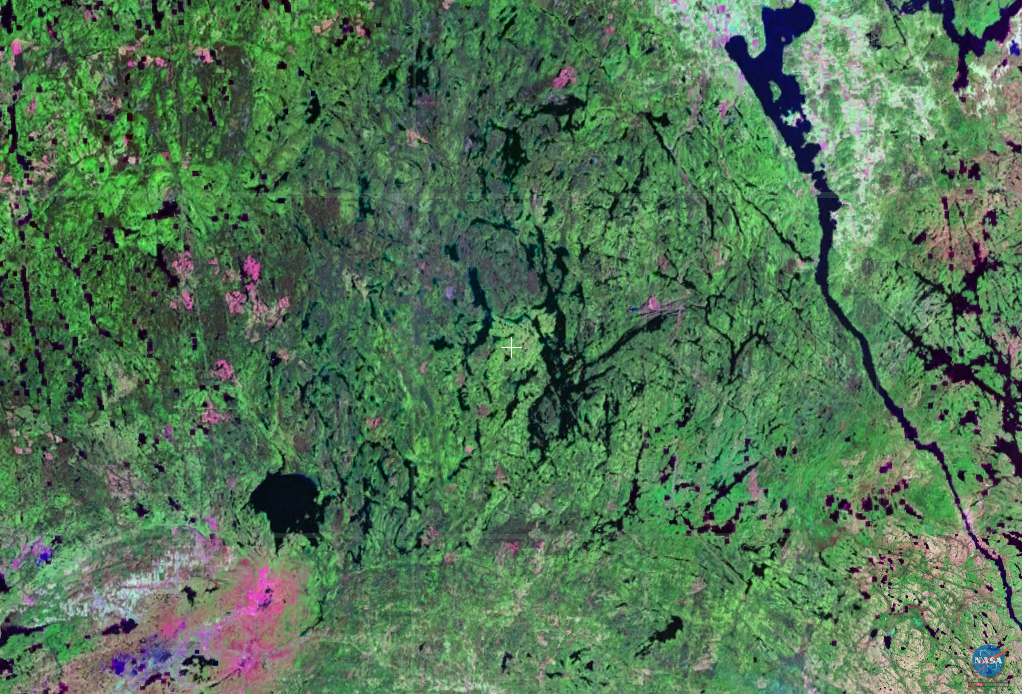
Landsat image showing the anomaly, cross is at the centre of it. Shows the terrain only, not the magnetic deviations of the area.

The Temagami Magnetic Anomaly, also called the Temagami Anomaly or the Wanapitei Anomaly, is a magnetic anomaly resulting from a large buried geologic structure in the Canadian Shield near Temagami, Ontario, Canada. It stretches from Lake Wanapitei in the west to Bear Island in Lake Temagami.

The Indigenous community of Teme-Augama Anishnabai lies partly within the Temagami Magnetic Anomaly, including the Temagami First Nation on Bear Island. Located nearby are a number of other geological structures, including the Sudbury Basin, the Lake Wanapitei impact crater, and the Temagami Greenstone Belt.

== Discovery and structure ==
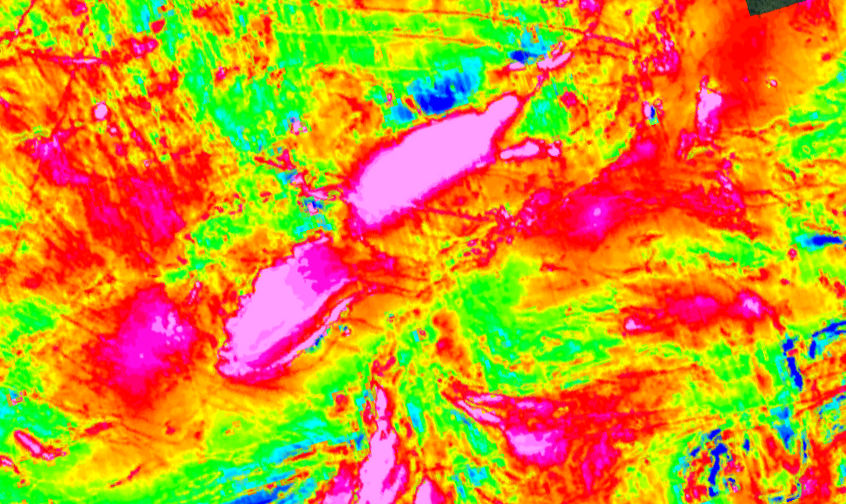
The Anomaly on a map, the larger pink spot near the center of the image.

The Temagami Magnetic Anomaly is egg-shaped, 58 km (36 mi) long and 19 km (12 mi) wide. The central section has the greatest amplitude and an east–west strike.

The Temagami Magnetic Anomaly was first found in the late 1940s during a magnetic survey by Norman Bell Keevil.

The western portion appears smoother in character while the eastern section is long and narrow. With an areal extent of 50 x 15 km, it reaches a magnitude of approximately 10,000 nanoteslas, making it one of the largest positive anomalies in North America. The eastern section coincides with a small positive gravity anomaly, indicating the presence of dense rocks at depth. The anomaly was discovered by a magnetic survey and a gravity survey.

In 2014, a 2200m borehole was drilled at Afton Township where the anomaly is at its maximum. Analysis of the lowest most rocks indicated similarities with the quartz diorite dykes found at the Sudbury Igneous Complex, which were likely created at the same time as the Sudbury impact event.

== See also ==
- Maple Mountain (Ontario)
- Bangui magnetic anomaly
- Kursk Magnetic Anomaly
- Ishpatina Ridge
