= Magnetic anomaly =

Local variation in the Earth's magnetic field

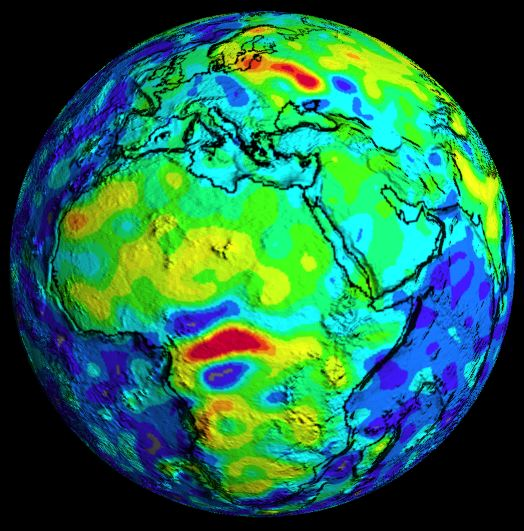
The Bangui magnetic anomaly in central Africa and the Kursk magnetic anomaly in eastern Europe (both in red)

In geophysics, a magnetic anomaly is a local variation in the magnetic field of a planetary body resulting from variations in the chemistry or magnetism of the rocks. Mapping of variation over an area is valuable in detecting structures obscured by overlying material. The magnetic variation (geomagnetic reversals) in successive bands of ocean floor parallel with mid-ocean ridges was important evidence for seafloor spreading, a concept central to the theory of plate tectonics.

== Measurement ==
Magnetic anomalies are generally a small fraction of the magnetic field. The total field ranges from 25,000 to 65,000 nanoteslas (nT). To measure anomalies, magnetometers need a sensitivity of 10 nT or less. There are three main types of magnetometer used to measure magnetic anomalies:

1. The fluxgate magnetometer was developed during World War II to detect submarines. It measures the component along a particular axis of the sensor, so it needs to be oriented. On land, it is often oriented vertically, while in aircraft, ships and satellites it is usually oriented so the axis is in the direction of the field. It measures the magnetic field continuously, but drifts over time. One way to correct for drift is to take repeated measurements at the same place during the survey.
2. The proton precession magnetometer measures the strength of the field but not its direction, so it does not need to be oriented. Each measurement takes a second or more. It is used in most ground surveys except for boreholes and high-resolution gradiometer surveys.
3. Optically pumped magnetometers, which use alkali gases (most commonly rubidium and caesium) have high sample rates and sensitivities of 0.001 nT or less, but are more expensive than the other types of magnetometers. They are used on satellites and in most aeromagnetic surveys.

== Data acquisition ==
=== Ground-based ===
In ground-based surveys, measurements are made at a series of stations, typically 15 to 60 m apart. Usually a proton precession magnetometer is used and it is often mounted on a pole. Raising the magnetometer reduces the influence of small ferrous objects that were discarded by humans. To further reduce unwanted signals, the surveyors do not carry metallic objects such as keys, knives or compasses, and objects such as motor vehicles, railway lines, and barbed wire fences are avoided. If some such contaminant is overlooked, it may show up as a sharp spike in the anomaly, so such features are treated with suspicion. The main application for ground-based surveys is the detailed search for minerals.

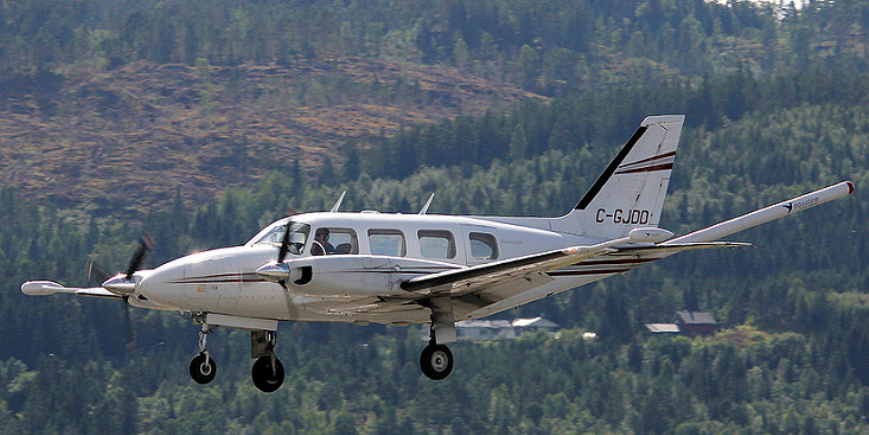

=== Aeromagnetic ===
Airborne magnetic surveys are often used in oil surveys to provide preliminary information for seismic surveys. In some countries such as Canada, government agencies have made systematic surveys of large areas. The survey generally involves making a series of parallel flight lines at a constant height and with intervals of anywhere from a few hundred meters to several kilometers. These are crossed by occasional tie lines, perpendicular to the main survey, to check for errors. The magnetic sensor is within the aircraft's magnetic field, which can be reduced by separating the sensor from the aircraft on a non-magnetic boom or towing it behind on a cable. Aeromagnetic surveys have a lower spatial resolution than ground surveys, but this can be an advantage for a regional survey of deeper rocks.

=== Shipborne ===
In shipborne surveys, a magnetometer is towed a few hundred meters behind a ship in a device called a fish. The sensor is kept at a constant depth of about 15 m. Otherwise, the procedure is similar to that used in aeromagnetic surveys.

=== Spacecraft ===
Sputnik 3 in 1958 was the first spacecraft to carry a magnetometer. In the autumn of 1979, Magsat was launched and jointly operated by NASA and USGS until the spring of 1980. It had a caesium vapor scalar magnetometer and a fluxgate vector magnetometer. CHAMP, a German satellite, made precise gravity and magnetic measurements from 2001 to 2010. A Danish satellite, Ørsted, was launched in 1999 and is still in operation, while the Swarm mission of the European Space Agency involves a "constellation" of three satellites that were launched in November, 2013.

== Data reduction ==
There are two main corrections that are needed for magnetic measurements. The first is removing short-term variations in the field from external sources; e.g., temporal variations which include diurnal variations that have a period of 24 hours and magnitudes of up to 30 nT, probably from the action of the solar wind on the ionosphere. In addition, magnetic storms can have peak magnitudes of 1000 nT and can last for several days. Their contribution can be measured by returning to a base station repeatedly or by having another magnetometer that periodically measures the field at a fixed location.

Second, since the anomaly is the local contribution to the magnetic field, the main geomagnetic field must be subtracted from it. The International Geomagnetic Reference Field is usually used for this purpose. This is a large-scale, time-averaged mathematical model of the Earth's field based on measurements from satellites, magnetic observatories and other surveys.

Some corrections that are needed for gravity anomalies are less important for magnetic anomalies. For example, the vertical gradient of the magnetic field is 0.03 nT/m or less, so an elevation correction is generally not needed.

== Interpretation ==
=== Theoretical background ===
Magnetic susceptibilities of common rocks and minerals
Type	Susceptibility ($\times 10^{-3}$ SI)
Sedimentary
Limestones	0–3
Sandstones	0–20
Shales	0.01–15
Coal	0.02
Igneous
Basalt	0.2–175
Gabbro	1–90
Granite	0–50
Rhyolite	0.2–35
Metamorphic
Gneiss	0.1–25
Serpentine	3–17
Slate	0–35
Minerals
Graphite	0.1
Quartz	-0.01
Clays	0.2
Pyrrhotite	1–6000
Magnetite	1200–19200

The magnetization in the surveyed rock is the vector sum of induced and remanent magnetization:

$$\mathbf{M} = \mathbf{M}_\text{i} + \mathbf{M}_\text{r}.$$

The induced magnetization of many minerals is the product of the ambient magnetic field and their magnetic susceptibility χ:

$$\mathbf{M}_\text{i} = \chi \mathbf{H}.$$

Some susceptibilities are given in the table.

Minerals that are diamagnetic or paramagnetic only have an induced magnetization. Ferromagnetic minerals such as magnetite also can carry a remanent magnetization or remanence. This remanence can last for millions of years, so it may be in a completely different direction from the present Earth's field. If a remanence is present, it is difficult to separate from the induced magnetization unless samples of the rock are measured. The ratio of the magnitudes, Q = M_{r}/M_{i}, is called the Koenigsberger ratio.

=== Magnetic anomaly modeling ===
Interpretation of magnetic anomalies is usually done by matching observed and modeled values of the anomalous magnetic field. An algorithm developed by Talwani and Heirtzler(1964) (and further elaborated by Kravchinsky et al., 2019) treats both induced and remnant magnetizations as vectors and allows theoretical estimation of the remnant magnetization from the existing apparent polar wander paths for different tectonic units or continents.

== Applications ==
=== Ocean floor stripes ===
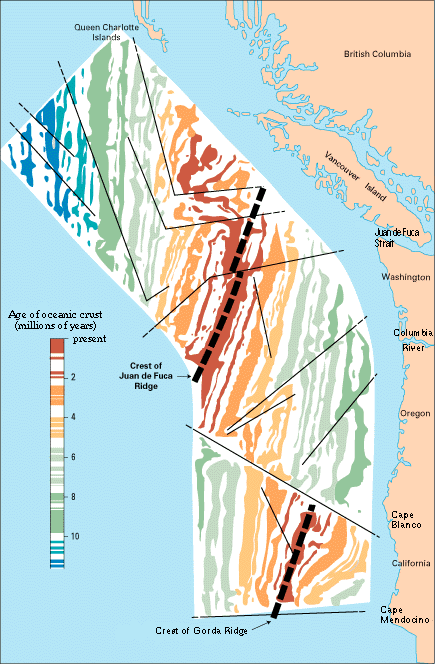
Magnetic anomalies around the Juan de Fuca and Gorda ridges, off the west coast of North America, color-coded by age

Magnetic surveys over the oceans have revealed a characteristic pattern of anomalies around mid-ocean ridges. They involve a series of positive and negative anomalies in the intensity of the magnetic field, forming stripes running parallel to each ridge. They are often symmetric about the axis of the ridge. The stripes are generally tens of kilometers wide, and the anomalies are a few hundred nanoteslas. The source of these anomalies is primarily permanent magnetization carried by titanomagnetite minerals in basalt and gabbros. They are magnetized when ocean crust is formed at the ridge. As magma rises to the surface and cools, the rock acquires a thermoremanent magnetization in the direction of the field. Then the rock is carried away from the ridge by the motions of the tectonic plates. Every few hundred thousand years, the direction of the magnetic field reverses. Thus, the pattern of stripes is a global phenomenon and can be used to calculate the velocity of seafloor spreading.

=== Planetary science ===
Beyond the Earth, magnetic anomalies have been discovered on the Moon and the planets Mercury and Mars. These anomalies provide useful clues about the geological processes that built their crust. On the Moon, magnetic anomalies are often (but not always) associated with lunar swirls. These local anomalies shield the surface from space weathering by the solar wind. For Mercury, the magnetic anomalies are associated with impact craters. These are presumed to be the result of impact melts enriched with iron from the impactor in the presence of a global magnetic field. The result is a record of the historical magnetic pole orientation and strength.

== In fiction ==
In the Space Odyssey series by Arthur C. Clarke, a series of monoliths are left by extraterrestrials for humans to find. One near the crater Tycho is found by its unnaturally powerful magnetic field and named Tycho Magnetic Anomaly 1 (TMA-1). One orbiting Jupiter is named TMA-2, and one in the Olduvai Gorge is found in 2513 and retroactively named TMA-0 because it was first encountered by primitive humans.

== See also ==
- World Digital Magnetic Anomaly Map (WDMAM)
- Notable anomalies:
  - Bangui magnetic anomaly
  - Kursk Magnetic Anomaly
  - Levantine Iron Age Anomaly
  - South Atlantic Anomaly
  - Temagami Magnetic Anomaly
- Magnetic anomaly detector
- Enhanced Magnetic Model (EMM)
- Lunar swirls – patterns associated with lunar magnetic anomalies
