= Szabolcs Czira =

Hungarian politician

Member of the National Assembly
- In office 18 June 1998 – 5 May 2014

Personal details
- Born: 28 September 1951 (age 74) Nagykőrös, Hungary
- Party: Fidesz (since 2002)
- Other political affiliations: MSZMP (1987–89); FKGP (1993–2002)
- Spouse: Dr Tímea Cziráné Kőházi Kis
- Children: Tímea; Szabolcs
- Profession: politician

Dr Szabolcs Czira (born 28 September 1951) is a Hungarian politician, member of the National Assembly (MP) for Nagykőrös (Pest County Constituency XVI) from 1998 to 2014. He was a member of the Committee on Employment and Labour. Czira is the current mayor of Nagykőrös since 2002.

Czira joined the Hungarian Socialist Workers' Party (MSZMP) in late 1987. He was a member of the Independent Smallholders, Agrarian Workers and Civic Party (FKGP) from 1993 until 2002. He served as deputy leader of its parliamentary group between 2001 and 2002. He joined Fidesz in 2002.

== Personal life ==
He is married to Dr Tímea Cziráné Kőházi Kis. They have a daughter, Tímea and a son, Szabolcs.
