= Bangui magnetic anomaly =

Local variation of the Earth's magnetic field in central Africa

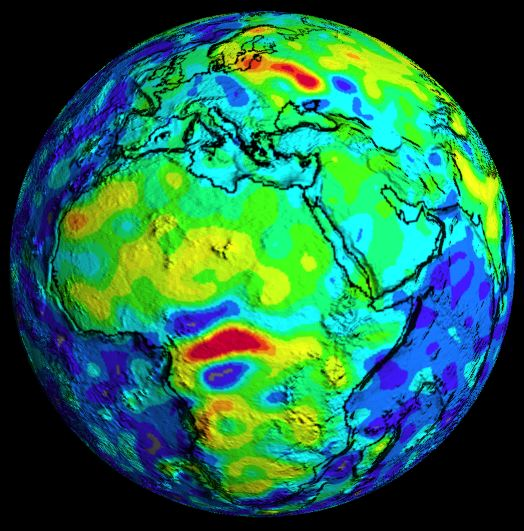
Magnetic intensity from satellite data. The Bangui anomaly is the high-intensity (red) anomaly in central Africa while the Kursk anomaly is the European one to the north.

The Bangui magnetic anomaly is a local variation in the Earth's magnetic field centered at Bangui, Central African Republic. The magnetic anomaly is roughly elliptical, about 700 km × 1,000 km (430 mi × 620 mi), and covers most of the country, making it one of the "largest and most intense crustal magnetic anomalies on the African continent". The anomaly was discovered in the late 1950s, explored in the 1970s, and named in 1982. Its origin remains unclear.

== History ==
In 1962, Raymond Godivier and Lucien Le Donche reported on a magnetic anomaly in the Central African Republic, which they identified by analyzing their surface magnetic activity data of 1956. These results were confirmed and built upon by the high-altitude aeromagnetic surveys carried out by the United States Naval Oceanographic Office, as well as by the satellite measurements conducted in 1964 with Cosmos 49 and in the 1970s with the Orbiting Geophysical Observatory at 350–500 kilometres (220–310 mi) altitudes. This data was combined in 1973 and yielded a spatial map of Earth's magnetic field, which was then updated after the launch of the Magsat satellite with an accuracy of 15 nT at an altitude of 400 kilometres (250 mi). In 1982, Robert D. Regan and Bruce D. Marsh named the anomaly after the city located at its center. The anomaly is sometimes called the Bangui negative anomaly, owing to its negative peak-to-trough difference, and is compared with the positive anomalies observed at the Benue Trough and Congo Basin where Lower Cambrian geological formations are exposed.

== Salient features ==
The Bangui anomaly is bounded to the south by the Walvis Ridge, the north by the Cameroon–St. Helena volcanic line, and to the west by the Mid-Atlantic Ridge. It is shaped approximately as an ellipse 700 km × 1,000 km (430 mi × 620 mi) in size. It has three sections, and the magnetic equator runs through its center. It has a short axis diameter of about 550 kilometres (340 mi), and its amplitude varies between –1000 nT at ground level and –20 nT at satellite altitude, about 400 kilometres (250 mi).

Its features include a Bouguer gravity anomaly of −120 mGal, a topographical surface feature shaped as a ring of 810 km (500 mi) diameter, rock features of Late Archean and Proterozoic periods in the central part of the anomaly, granulites, and charnockites rock formations supplemented by granites at the lower crust level, and greenstone belts, and metamorphosed basalts seen as rock exposures. A zone of thinner crust bounds the anomaly to the north and a zone of relatively thicker crust is on the southern edge.

Parts of South America and Africa around 545 Ma. See also Pannotia.

== Origin ==
Two theories have been suggested for the origin of the Bangui anomaly, neither being conclusive. One theory points to a large igneous intrusion and the other to a meteorite impact in the Precambrian (before 540 Ma). To support the latter theory, a connection was drawn with a meteorite impact that may have occurred in Brazil in Bahia state causing formation of carbonados (black diamond aggregates) which are found only in the Central African Republic and Brazil.

== See also ==
- Popigai diamonds
- Temagami Magnetic Anomaly
- Ishpatina Ridge
- Kursk Magnetic Anomaly
