= International Association of Geomagnetism and Aeronomy =

- Abbreviation: IAGA
- Formation: 1873
- Type: INGO
- Region served: Worldwide
- Official language: English
- President: Andrew Yau; Canada
- Parent organization: International Union of Geodesy and Geophysics
- Website: IAGA Official website

The International Association of Geomagnetism and Aeronomy (IAGA) is an international scientific association that focuses on the study of terrestrial and planetary magnetism and space physics.

IAGA is one of the eight associations of the International Union of Geodesy and Geophysics. It is a non-governmental body funded through the subscriptions paid to IUGG by its member countries. IAGA have been responsible for developing and maintaining the International Geomagnetic Reference Field, a reference for the magnetic field of the Earth that was adopted in 1968 and is updated every five years. The most recent version is IGRF-12.

== History ==
IAGA has a long history and can trace its origins to the Commission for Terrestrial Magnetism and Atmospheric Electricity, part of the World Meteorological Organization originated from the International Meteorological Organization (IMO), which was founded in 1873. At the First IUGG General Assembly (Rome, 1922), the Section de Magnétisme et Electricité Terrestres became one of the constituent sections of the Union. At the IV IUGG General Assembly (Stockholm, 1930), it became the International Association of Terrestrial Magnetism and Electricity. It took its present name at the X IUGG General Assembly (Rome, 1954).

== Commissions ==
IAGA is subdivided into the following divisions and commissions, each with working groups on subjects of interest:

- Division I: Internal Magnetic Fields
- Division II: Aeronomic Phenomena
- Division III: Magnetospheric Phenomena
- Division IV: Solar Wind and Interplanetary Field
- Division V: Geomagnetic Observatories, Surveys and Analyses
- Division VI: Electromagnetic Induction in the Earth and Planetary Bodies
- Interdivisional Commission on Developing Countries
- Interdivisional Commission on History
- Interdivisional Commission on Education and Outreach
- Interdivisional Commission on Space Weather

== See also ==
- Intermagnet
- List of geoscience organizations
