= Commission for the Geological Map of the World =

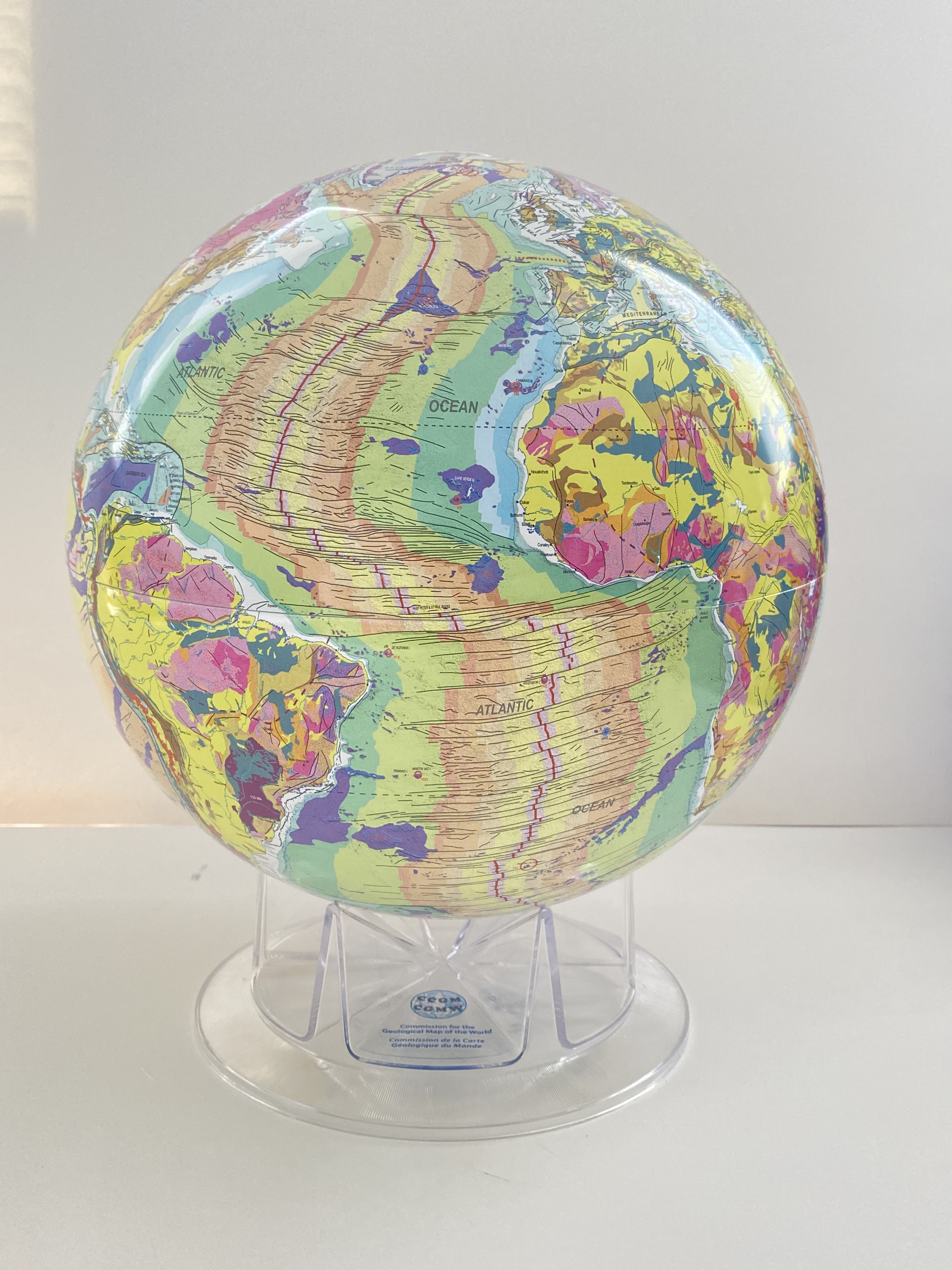
Geological globe of the world

The Commission for the Geological Map of the World (CGMW) is an international association in the field of geology. Its main role is the production of small-scale geological or geoscience-related maps of the world, or parts of the world. It is an organization affiliated to the International Union of Geological Sciences (IUGS) and International Union of Geodesy and Geophysics (IUGG) and is a UNESCO-related scientific NGO. The Commission has an office in Paris, France; the French name for the association is Commission de la Carte Géologique du Monde.

== Brief history ==
The origin of CGMW is rooted in the II IGC (International Geological Congress) held in 1881 in Bologna (Italy), when it was decided to draw a geological map of Europe. When created, the CGME (Commission for the Geological Map of Europe) comprised 6 members, representing Austria, Germany, Hungary, France, Great Britain and Russia, and Berlin was proposed as the place for the headquarters. At the XI IGC (1910, Stockholm, Sweden), the CGME resolved "that it will be possible to achieve a first edition in one year ..." and the possibility of preparing a map of the world supported by wide international cooperation was officially mentioned for the first time. At the XII IGC (1913, Toronto, Canada), CGME presented the first edition of the geological map of Europe (49 sheets at 1:1.5M scale), and a resolution on the project for an "International Geological Map of Europe and new map of the World" was accepted. The resolution on the project at the XIV IGC (1926, Madrid, Spain) on the discussion on problems of the geological maps of Europe and the World continued. The name of the Commission: "Commission de la Carte géologique internationale du Monde" first appeared at a meeting on 27 May 1926. The date of foundation of CGMW as an autonomous commission can be defined as 1913.

World War II reduced the international activities of geologists and the first post-war CGMW meeting was held at the XVIII IGC (1948, London, UK) where the relationships between IGC and CGMW were stated: la Commission de la Carte Géologique du Monde est une Commission du Congrès Géologique International [The CGMW is a Commission of the IGC]. In 1962, the CGMW general assembly (G.A) was held in Paris, and for the first time at UNESCO. This schedule of a G.A in Paris, between those held every four years during the IGCs, became the rule (i.e a G.A every two years). In 1966, the CGMW joined the IUGS (International Union of geological Sciences, itself founded in 1961). "At present, therefore, this Commission is a permanent commission and affiliated to IUGS as an International Association of IGC.

The statutes of CGMW were established for the first time in 1966 and, after some revisions, finally stabilized at the XXVI IGC (1980, Paris, France) and remain roughly unchanged since then (2024). From 1980, CGMW has now a legal frame under French law, since it was officially registered on October 26, 1981 as a "French Association governed by the law of 1901". The article 5 defines that "Statutory members are national organizations responsible for solid earth science mapping of all the countries or territories of the world which adhere to CGMW " and "associate members are public or private organizations interested in and supportive of the CGMW's work ...".

== CGMW World maps ==
The launch of a Geological Atlas of the World at 1:10M scale project (continents and oceans) was approved during the XX IGC (Mexico City, 1956) and launched in 1966. This huge project was shared between CGMW (preparation of maps) and UNESCO (grants to CGMW collaborators and printing). The 22 maps of the Geological Atlas of the World were co-published by CGMW and UNESCO from 1974 to 1984.

In January 1983, the wall map concept of the Geological Map of the World was revived at the UNESCO G.A. and the 1st edition at 1:25M scale was published in 1990. For the first time, continental geology was shown, alongside ocean geology, on a single map. The 2nd edition (2000), benefited from new imaging techniques based on satellite altimetry combined with on-board multibeam echo sounder bathymetry, representing a remarkable technological breakthrough: the ocean floor took on a new aspect, clarifying the structure of the oceans on a smaller scale than before. In the 3rd edition (2010) (11), the morphology of the ocean floor was even finer, thanks to data freely available from the world's major geophysical databases. In addition, the considerable growth and greater reliability of geochronological techniques has provided better resolution of the main subdivisions of the Precambrian. Above all, the survey of major magmatic pulses on land and offshore (hot spots, flood basalts, oceanic plateaus, etc.) was taken into account, leading to a significant upgrade of the 2nd edition.

== CGMW Continental and oceanic maps ==
Geological and tectonic maps of the continents (at 1:5M scale) and structural maps of oceans (at 1:20M scale) were drawn by the regional (Africa, North America, South America, Antarctica, Southern and Eastern Asia, Australia-Oceania, Middle East, Northern Eurasia, Europe) and thematic (Tectonic-, Metallogenic-, Magmatic & Metamorphic-, Natural Hazards-, Sea-Floor-, Hydrogeologic- and Geophysical- maps) CGMW sub-commissions leading to a complete coverage of the Earth.

The standard color codes for the geological timescale agreed by ICS (International Commission on Stratigraphy of the IUGS) are determined by CGMW.

In 2020 IUGS, launched the Deep-time Digital Earth (DDE), a big science program dedicated to facilitate innovation in understanding the Earth's evolution and applications as well as the Sustainable Development Goals. In the frame of this new program, CGMW produced a 1:5M scale fully digital geological map of the continents and oceans of the world. CGMW remains in charge of the continuing upgrading of this digital map.
