= Vibrating-sample magnetometer =

Scientific instrument to measure magnetic properties

VSM schematic

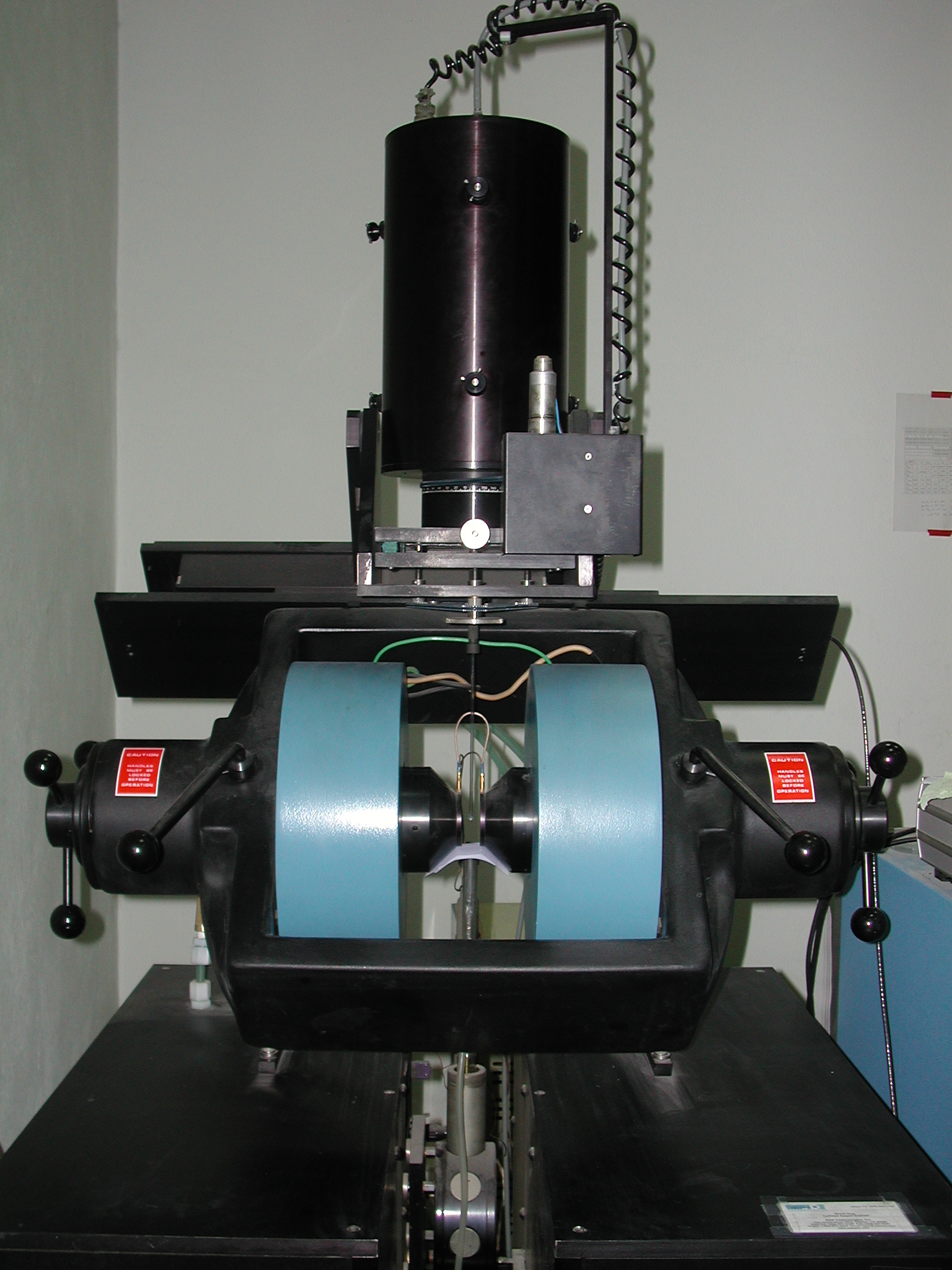
VSM setup

A vibrating-sample magnetometer (VSM) (also referred to as a Foner magnetometer/oscillation magnetometer) is a scientific instrument that measures magnetic properties based on Faraday's Law of Induction. Simon Foner at MIT Lincoln Laboratory invented VSM in 1955 and reported it in 1959. Also it was mentioned by G.W. Van Oosterhout and by P.J Flanders in 1956. A sample is first placed in a constant magnetic field and if the sample is magnetic it will align its magnetization with the external field. The magnetic dipole moment of the sample creates a magnetic field that changes as a function of time as the sample is moved up and down. This is typically done through the use of a piezoelectric material. The alternating magnetic field induces an electric field in the pickup coils of the VSM. The current is proportional to the magnetization of the sample - the greater the induced current, the greater the magnetization. As a result, typically a hysteresis curve will be recorded and from there the magnetic properties of the sample can be deduced.

The idea of vibrating sample came from D. O. Smith's vibrating-coil magnetometer.

== Typical VSM overview ==
=== Working principle ===
Vibrating Sample Magnetometry is based on the physical principle of electromagnetic induction: A sample with magnetic moment $\mu$ is placed in a homogeneous magnetic field $\mathbf{B}$. The sample is vibrated in the field with position $z(t)$, which causes a change in the magnetic flux

$\Phi = \int_A \mathbf{B}\cdot d\mathbf{A}=\mu_0\int_A\mathbf{\mu}\cdot d\mathbf{A}$

in a sensing coil with cross-sectional area $\mathbf{A}$, $\mu_0$ is the vacuum permeability. According to Faraday's law of induction, the change in the magnetic flux is proportional to an induced electric voltage

$U_\mathrm{ind} = \frac{d\Phi}{dt} = \frac{dz}{dt}\frac{d\Phi}{dz}$.

The first factor $\frac{dz}{dt}$ is directly dependent on the device and is thus known to the experimenter. The second factor is proportional to $\mu$. Factors of proportionality are determined through calibration of the setup.

Because $U_\mathrm{ind}\propto\mu$ with all further factors either determined from the device or through calibration, a measurement of the induced voltage directly yields the magnetic moment of the sample.

=== Parts of a typical VSM setup ===
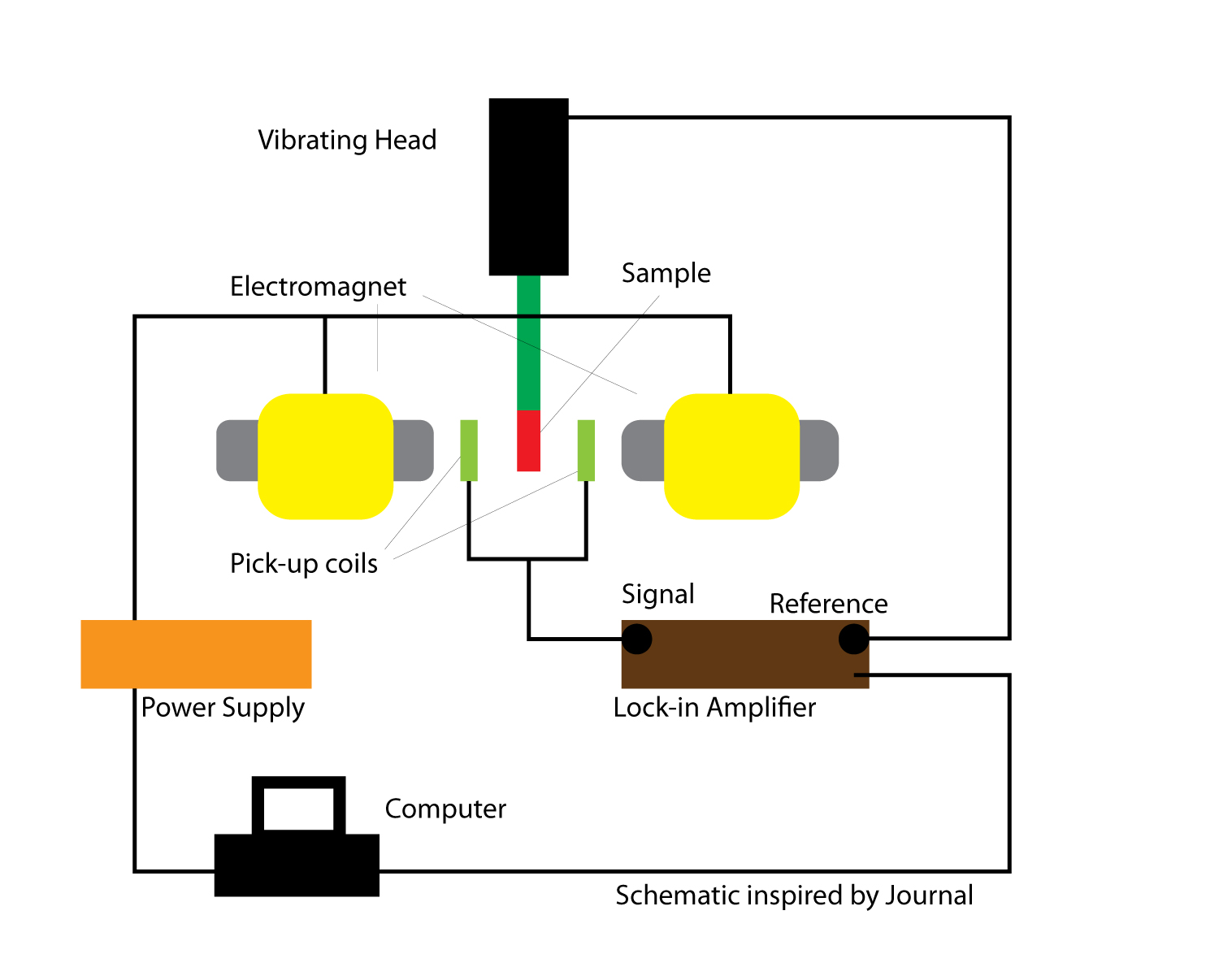
Simplified VSM schematic

- Actively cooled electromagnet/power supply
- Amplifier
- Control Chassis
- Meter
- Computer interface
- Sensor coils
- Vibration exciter with sample holder
- Hall probe (optional)

=== Sample Operating Procedure ===
1. Mounting the sample in the sample holder
2. Turning on the VSM system
3. Run the computer software to initialize the system
4. Calibrate the system
5. Optimize the system for M
6. Calibrate the Lock-In Amplifier
7. Take measurements and record data

=== Conditions for VSM to be effective ===
1. Magnetic field must be strong enough to fully saturate the samples (or else inaccurate measurements will be taken)
2. Magnetic field must be uniform across the sample space (otherwise the addition of field gradients will induce force that alter the vibration once again leading to inaccurate results

==== Importance of pick-up coils ====
These allow the VSM to maximize the induced signal, reduce the noise, give a wide saddle point, minimize the volume in between the sample and electromagnet to achieve a more uniform magnetic field at the sample space. The configuration of the coils can vary depending on the type of material being studied.

== Relation to Physics ==
The VSM relies on Faraday's law of induction, with the detection of the emf given by $\varepsilon = N{d \over dt}(BAcos\vartheta)$, where N is the number of wire turns, A is the area, and $\vartheta$ the angle between the normal of the coil and the B field. However, N and A are often unnecessary if the VSM is properly calibrated. By varying the strength of the electromagnet through computer software, the external field is swept from high to low and back to high. Typically this is automated through a computer process and a cycle of data is printed out. The electromagnet is typically attached to a rotating base so as to allow the measurements be taken as a function of angle. The external field is applied parallel to the sample length and the aforementioned cycle prints out a hysteresis loop. Then using known magnetization of the calibration material and wire volume the high field voltage signal can be converted into emu units - useful for analysis.

== Advantages and Disadvantages ==
The precision and accuracy of VSM's are quite high even among other magnetometers and can be on the order of ~ $\displaystyle 10^ {-6}$ emu. VSM's further allow for a sample to be tested at varying angles with respect to its magnetization letting researchers minimize the effects of external influences. However, VSM's are not well suited for determining the magnetization loop due to the demagnetizing effects incurred by the sample. VSM's further suffer from temperature dependence and cannot be used on fragile samples that cannot undergo acceleration (from the vibration).

== See also ==
- Magnetometer
- Alternating (Field) Gradient Magnetometer (AFGM or AGM)
- SQUID Magnetometer
