= Gradiometer =

Scientific instrument to measure gradients from physical properties

A gradiometer is a scientific instrument for measuring the spatial gradient of a physical quantity (i.e., its rate of change with respect to position coordinates), such as:

- Gravity gradiometer
- Magnetic gradiometer

== See also ==
- Magnetoencephalography
- Geophysical survey (archaeology)
