= MEMS magnetic field sensor =

Small-scale magnetometer

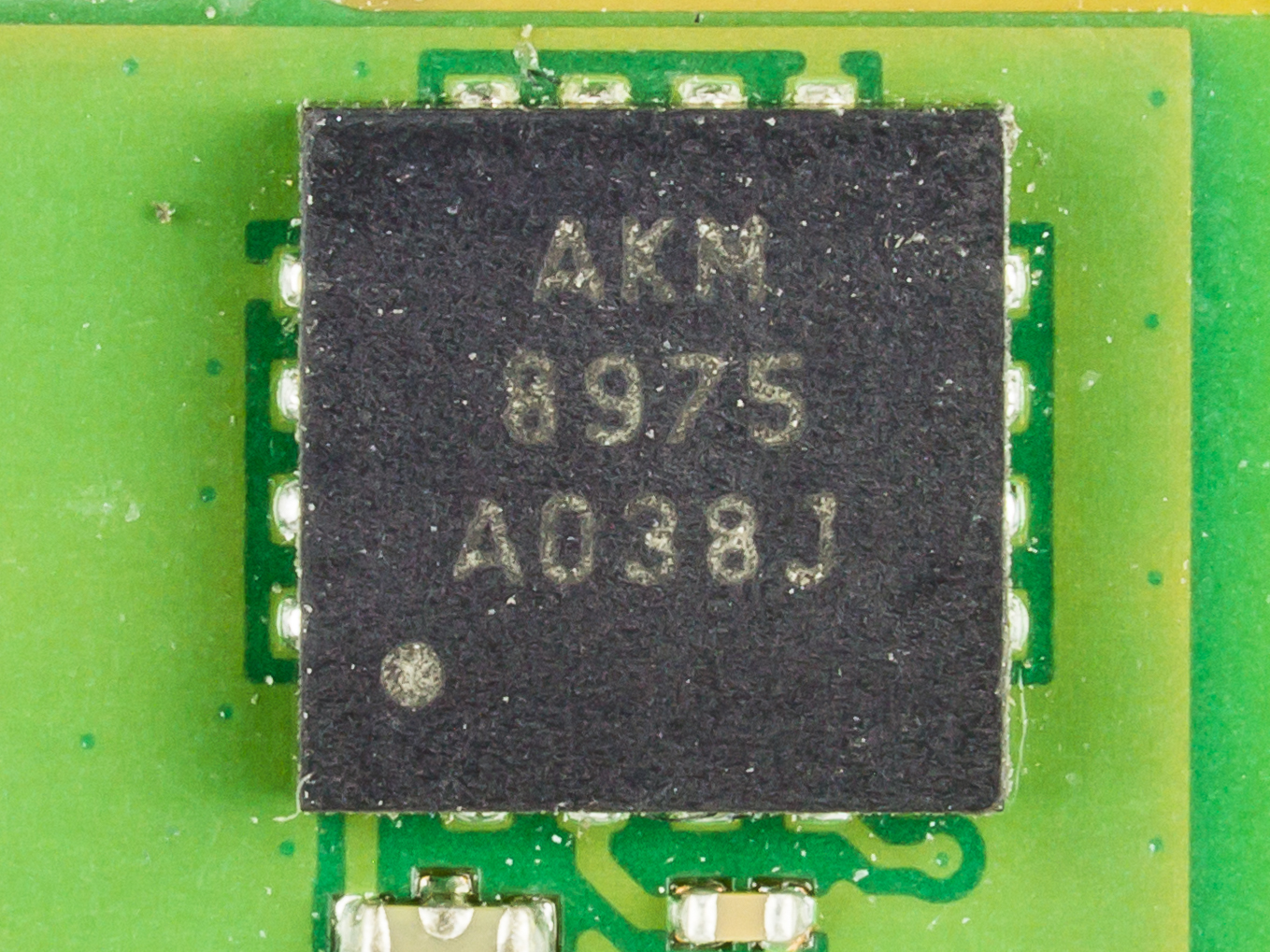
Tri-axis Electronic Magnetometer by AKM Semiconductor, inside Motorola Xoom

A MEMS magnetic field sensor is a small-scale microelectromechanical systems (MEMS) device for detecting and measuring magnetic fields (magnetometer). Many of these operate by detecting effects of the Lorentz force: a change in voltage or resonant frequency may be measured electronically, or a mechanical displacement may be measured optically. Compensation for temperature effects is necessary. Its use as a miniaturized compass may be one such simple example application.

== Magnetic field sensing ==
Magnetometers can be categorized into four general types depending on the magnitude of the measured field. If the targeted B-field is larger than the earth magnetic field (maximum value around 60 μT), the sensor does not need to be very sensitive. To measure the earth field larger than the geomagnetic noise(around 0.1 nT), better sensors are required. For the application of magnetic anomaly detection, sensors at different locations have to be used to cancel the spatial-correlated noise in order to achieve a better spatial resolution. To measure the field below the geomagnetic noise, much more sensitive magnetic field sensors have to be employed. These sensors are mainly used in medical and biomedical applications, such as MRI and molecule tagging.

There are many approaches for magnetic sensing, including the Hall-effect sensor, magneto-diode, magneto-transistor, AMR magnetometer, GMR magnetometer, magnetic tunnel junction magnetometer, magneto-optical sensor, Lorentz force based MEMS sensor, electron tunneling based MEMS sensor, MEMS compass, Nuclear precession magnetic field sensor, optically pumped magnetic field sensor, fluxgate magnetometer, search coil magnetic field sensor and SQUID magnetometer.

=== Figures of merit of MEMS magnetic sensor ===
MEMS magnetic sensors have several parameters: quality factor (Q), resonance frequency, mode shape, responsivity, and resolution.

Quality factor is a measure of how much energy can be maintained during vibration of the resonator. There might be several factors that can damp the resonator, such as mechanical damping of resonator itself or damping from outside pressure and temperature.

Resonance frequency is the frequency at which the device vibrates with the highest amplitude (or the longest, as a struck bell or tuning fork). Resonance frequency is governed by geometry of the device. We can calculate resonance frequency when we know dimension of the device, equivalent Young's modulus of the device, and the equivalent density of the device.

Mode shape is the pattern of the vibration of resonator.

Responsivity (which contributes to resolution) describes the size of the oscillation we can get from devices with same external condition. If we apply the same current and B field to several resonators, devices that show larger vibration amplitudes are said to have a higher responsivity. All other things being equal, a higher responsivity device is more sensitive. The range of magnetometers based on piezoelectric resonators is mV/T (millivolt/tesla), so higher responsivity is generally better.

Resolution refers to the smallest magnetic field a device can measure. The smaller the number, the more sensitive the device. The range of magnetometers based on piezoelectric resonator is a few nT (nanotesla).

=== Advantages of MEMS-based sensors ===
A MEMS-based magnetic field sensor is small, so it can be placed close to the measurement location and thereby achieve higher spatial resolution than other magnetic field sensors. Additionally, constructing a MEMS magnetic field sensor does not require the microfabrication of magnetic material. Therefore, the cost of the sensor can be greatly reduced. Integration of MEMS sensor and microelectronics can further reduce the size of the entire magnetic field sensing system.

== Lorentz-force-based MEMS sensor ==
This type of sensor relies on the mechanical motion of the MEMS structure due to the Lorentz force acting on the current-carrying conductor in the magnetic field. The mechanical motion of the micro-structure is sensed either electronically or optically. The mechanical structure is often driven to its resonance in order to obtain the maximum output signal. Piezoresistive and electrostatic transduction methods can be used in the electronic detection. Displacement measurement with laser source or LED source can also be used in the optical detection. Several sensors will be discussed in the following subsections in terms of different output for the sensor.

=== Voltage sensing ===
Beroulle et al. fabricated a U-shape cantilever beam on a silicon substrate. Two piezo-resistors are laid on the support ends. There is an 80-turn Al coil passing current along the U-shape beam. A Wheatstone bridge is formed by connecting the two "active" resistors with another two "passive" resistors, which are free of strain. When there is an external magnetic field applied to the current carrying conductor, motion of the U-shape beam will induce strain in the two "active" piezo-resistors and thereby generate an output voltage across the Wheatstone bridge which is proportional to the magnetic field flux density. The reported sensitivity for this sensor is 530 m Vrms/T with a resolution 2 μT. Note that the frequency of the exciting current is set to be equal to the resonant frequency of the U-shape beam in order to maximize the sensitivity.

Herrera-May et al. fabricated a sensor with similar piezoresistive read-out approach but with different mechanical motion. Their sensor relies on the torsional motion of a micro-plate fabricated from silicon substrate. The exciting current loop contains 8 turns of aluminum coil. The location of the current loop enables a more uniform Lorentz force distribution compared with the aforementioned U-shape cantilever beam. The reported sensitivity is 403 mVrms/T with a resolution 143 nT.

Kádár et al. also chose the micro-torsional beam as the mechanical structure. Their read-out approach is different. Instead of using piezoresistive transduction, their sensor relies on electrostatic transduction. They patterned several electrodes on the surface of the micro-plate and another external glass wafer. The glass wafer is then bonded with the silicon substrate to form a variable capacitor array. Lorentz force generated by the external magnetic field results in the change of capacitor array. The reported sensitivity is 500 Vrms/T with a resolution of a few mT. The resolution can reach 1 nT with vacuum operation.

Emmerich et al. fabricated the variable capacitor array on a single silicon substrate with comb-figure structure. The reported sensitivity is 820 Vrms/T with a resolution 200 nT at the pressure level of 1mbar.

=== Frequency shift sensing ===
Another type of Lorentz force based MEMS magnetic field sensor utilizes the shift of mechanical resonance due to the Lorentz force applying to certain mechanical structures.

Sunier et al. change the structure of aforementioned U-shape cantilever beam by adding a curved-in support. The piezoresistive sensing bridge is laid between two heating actuation resistors. Frequency response of the output voltage of the sensing bridge is measured to determine the resonant frequency of the structure. Note that in this sensor, the current flowing through the aluminum coil is DC. The mechanical structure is actually driven by the heating resistor at its resonance. Lorentz force applying at the U-shape beam will change the resonant frequency of the beam and thereby change the frequency response of the output voltage. The reported sensitivity is 60 kHz/T with a resolution of 1 μT.

Bahreyni et al. fabricated a comb figure structure on top of the silicon substrate. The center shuttle are connected to two clamped-clamped conductors used to change the internal stress of the moving structure when external magnetic field is applied. This will induce the change of the resonant frequency of the comb finger structure. This sensor use electrostatic transduction to measure the output signal. The reported sensitivity is improved to 69.6 Hz/T thanks to the high mechanical quality factor (Q = 15000 @ 2 Pa) structure in the vacuum environment. The reported resolution is 217 nT.

=== Optical sensing ===
The optical sensing is to directly measure the mechanical displacement of the MEMS structure to find the external magnetic field.

Zanetti et al. fabricated a Xylophone beam. Current that is flowing through the center conductor and Xylophone beam will be deflected as the Lorentz force is induced. Direct mechanical displacement is measured by an external laser source and a detector. The resolution of 1 nT can be reached. Wickenden had tried to shrink the footprint of this type of device by 100 times. But a much lower resolution of 150 μT was reported.

Keplinger et al. were trying to use an LED source for optical sensing instead of using an external laser source. Optical fibers were aligned on the silicon substrate with different arrangements for the displacement sensing. A resolution 10 mT is reported.

John Ojur Dennis, Farooq Ahmad, M. Haris Bin Md Khir and Nor Hisham Bin Hamid fabricated CMOS-MEMS sensor consists of a shuttle which is designed to resonate in the lateral direction (first mode of resonance). In the presence of an external magnetic field, the Lorentz force actuates the shuttle in the lateral direction and the amplitude of resonance is measured using an optical method. The differential change in the amplitude of the resonating shuttle shows the strength of the external magnetic field. The sensitivity of the sensor is determined in static mode to be 0.034 μm/mT when a current of 10 mA passes through the shuttle, while it is found to be higher at resonance with a value of 1.35 μm/mT at 8 mA current. Finally, the resolution of the sensor is found to be 370.37 μT.

== Temperature effects ==
When the temperature increases, the Young's modulus of the material used to fabricate the moving structure decreases, or more simply, the moving structure softens. Meanwhile, thermal expansion and thermal conductivity increase, with the temperature inducing an internal stress in the moving structure. These effects can result in the shift of the resonant frequency of the moving structure which is equivalent to noise for resonant frequency shift sensing or the voltage sensing. In addition, temperature rise will generate larger Johnson noise (affect the piezoresistive transduction) and increase mechanical fluctuation noise (which affects optical sensing). Therefore, advanced electronics for temperature effect compensation have to be used to maintain sensitivity as temperature changes.

== Applications ==
=== Detect flaws of electrically conductive material ===
Magnetometers based on piezoelectric resonators can be applied to finding flaws in safety-critical metal structures, such as airplane propellers, engines, fuselage and wing structures, or high pressure oil or gas pipelines. When a magnet (generally an electromagnet creating a varying frequency field) creates eddy currents in the material, the eddy currents generate another magnetic field in the material which can be sensed by the magnetometer. If there is no flaw or crack in the pipeline, the magnetic field from the eddy current shows a constant pattern as it moves along the material being tested. But a crack or pit in the material interrupts the eddy current, so the magnetic field is changed, allowing a sensitive magnetometer to sense and localize the flaw.

=== Monitoring health of organs of thoracic cavity ===
When we breathe, the nerves and muscles of our thoracic cavity create a weak magnetic field. Magnetometers based on piezoelectric resonators have high resolution (in the range of nT), allowing solid-state sensing of our respiratory system.
