= OpenUniverse =

3D Solar System simulator

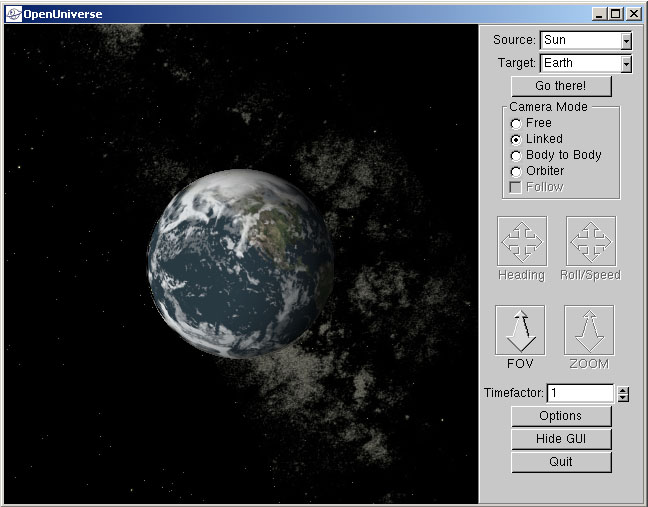
- OpenUniverse's rendition of the Earth and its user interface
- Original author: Raúl Alonso Álvarez
- Developers: Raúl Alonso Álvarez, Axel Groll, and Greg Christensen
- Initial release: November 1997
- Preview release: 1.0 beta 3 / 5 June 2000; 25 years ago
- Written in: C++, C
- Engine: Mesa 3D
- Operating system: Windows, Linux, MacOS
- Predecessor: Solar System Simulator (Ssystem)
- Successor: Celestia (Not actually affiliated with OU, but it superseded it by a long way)
- Size: 4.5 MB
- Type: Educational software, Simulation
- License: GPL v2
- Website: openuniverse.sourceforge.net
- Repository: sourceforge.net/projects/openuniverse/files/openuniverse/

OpenUniverse is a 3D Solar System simulator created by Raúl Alonso Álvarez. It uses OpenGL 1.1 (implemented through Mesa 3D) to simulate the Solar System in complete 3D, including its planets and their major and minor moons, along with a few asteroids with real 3D models created from real data. OpenUniverse is free software distributed under the GNU General Public License. OU is compatible with Windows 95/98/NT/2000, Linux/Unix, and MacOS (Ported by Sandy Martel, download link lost), and OpenGL 1.1 drivers are required for the program to run correctly. A high-resolution texture pack is available on the SourceForge, and it is linked on the official website under the Download section.

OU likely served as the inspiration for the much more widely used interactive planetarium program Celestia, which in itself served as the inspiration for the SpaceEngine procedural universe simulator.

== See also ==
- Orbiter
- Stellarium
- KStars
