= Celestia =

Astronomy computer program

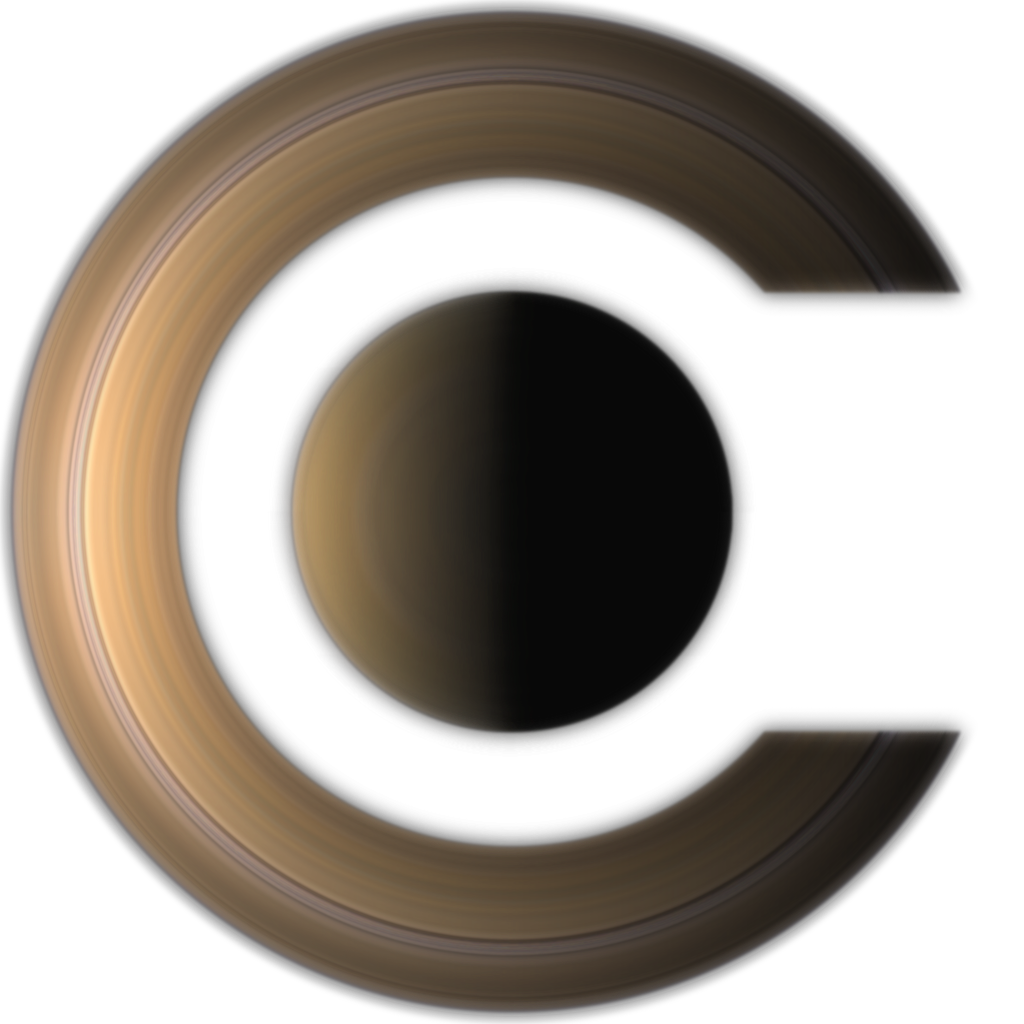

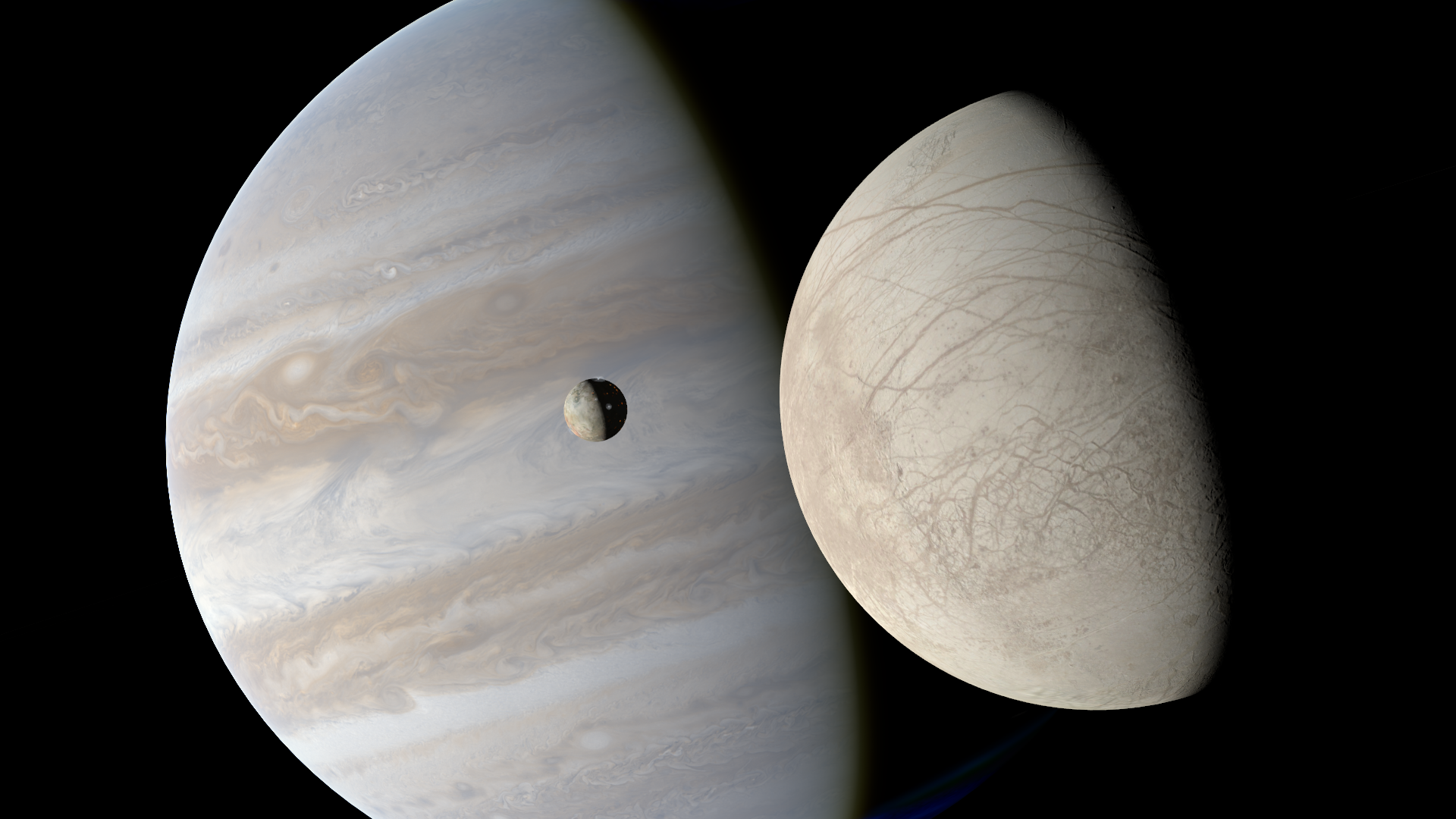
- Europa, Io, and Jupiter in Celestia
- Original author: Chris Laurel
- Developer: Celestia Development Team
- Release: 26 February 2001; 25 years ago
- Stable release: 1.6.4 / 5 November 2023; 2 years ago
- Written in: C++
- Operating system: AmigaOS 4, BSD, Linux, macOS, Microsoft Windows, iOS, Android, FreeBSD
- Size: Linux: 27.7 MB; AmigaOS 4: 44.4 MB macOS (1.6.x): 41.4 MB macOS (AppStore): 378 MB; Windows (1.6.4): 71.6 MB; Windows (1.7.0): 481 MB; Windows (Steam): 570 MB; FreeBSD: 65.7 MB; Source code: 15.6 MB
- Available in: 31 languages (Note: Although it is available, most languages are still a work in progress.)
- Type: Educational software
- License: GPLv2
- Website: celestiaproject.space
- Repository: github.com/CelestiaProject/Celestia

Celestia is a real-time 3D astronomy software program that was created in 2001 by Chris Laurel. The program allows users to virtually travel through the universe and explore celestial objects that have been catalogued. Celestia also doubles as a planetarium, but the user is not restricted to the Earth's surface, like in other planetarium software such as Stellarium. Celestia can display objects of various scales using OpenGL. (Note: There are three graphical front-ends available: GLUT, GTK+ or Qt.)

Celestia is available for AmigaOS 4, Linux, macOS, Microsoft Windows, Xbox, iOS, VisionOS, and Android. Celestia is also available on FreeBSD as both a binary package and a port. It is free and open source software released under the GNU General Public License.

Celestia's development stopped in 2013, with the final release in 2011. Since then, some of its development team went to work on celestia.Sci, a cosmological visualizer featuring more realistic rendering of galaxies and planets, gravitational lensing, and many other scientifically accurate enhancements, but there have been no updates on the progress of the program since 2020. The original creator of Celestia, Chris Laurel, created Fifth Star Labs shortly after Celestia's development stopped, and began working on a planetarium app called Sky Guide. In late 2016, the official Celestia forums were restored, and development restarted under a new development team. As of 2026, beta builds of version 1.7.0 are available. Celestia was ported to mobile devices in 2020, and in 2024 the same developer ported it to the Apple Vision Pro. In 2026, Celestia was released on Steam.

Celestia is available for download from its main website, celestiaproject.space, but it can be obtained from a multitude of free software websites and Steam as well. Between 2001 and May 2017, the former central distribution site SourceForge counted approximately 12 million downloads.

== Functions ==
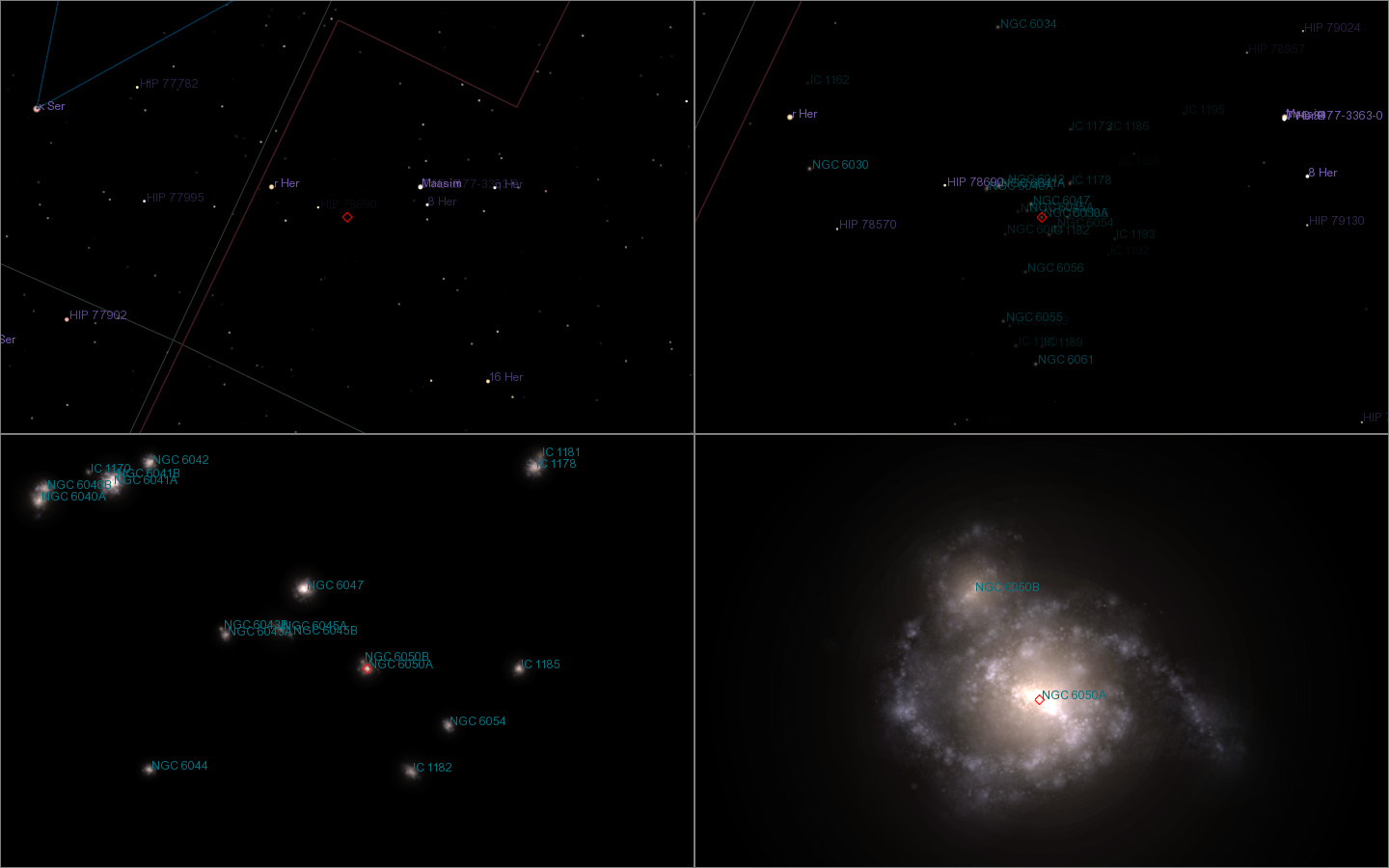
Typical DSO survey in Celestia

Celestia versions 1.6.4 and under display the Hipparcos Catalogue (HIP) of 118,322 stars and a compiled catalogue of galaxies, while version 1.7.0 includes stars from the Tycho-2 Catalogue alongside the Hipparcos stars, with some data from Gaia, increasing the star count to over 2 million. Celestia mainly uses the VSOP87 theory of planetary orbits to provide a solar and lunar eclipse finder and to display the orbital paths of planets, dwarf planets, moons, asteroids, comets, artificial satellites, and spacecraft, however the TASS 1.7 theory is used to display the orbits of the Saturnian satellites more accurately than with VSOP87.

Using the installed catalogues, the names of celestial objects can be displayed, including artificial satellites. The names and locations of Earth features such as continents, mountains, seas, oceans, and cities can also be displayed. Surface features on other celestial objects such as craters, basins and canyons can be shown as well.

Celestia allows users to navigate at different speeds, and allow users to orbit stars, planets, moons, and other space objects, track space objects such as spacecraft, asteroids, and comets as they fly by, or travel to and/or fly through galaxies. Light time delay is an optional function.

The time simulated by Celestia can be set to any time 2 billion years forward or backward from the present, although planetary orbits are only accurate within a few thousand years of the present day, and date arithmetic overflows at the year 5,874,774.

Celestia simulates the appearance of atmospheres on planets and moons, planetshine on orbiting satellites, and miscellaneous planetary details such as sunrise and sunset. Information about the objects that Celestia draws can also be displayed, such as temperature, mass, distance from observer, radius, rotational period, luminosity, and more.

The user can change Celestia's field of view, and the window can be split into multiple different panes, meaning that several objects can be displayed on the screen at once. Screenshots and movies can be captured in classic or HD resolutions. Celestia's support for gamepads and joysticks is relatively limited.

Celestia can be extended with new objects, and has support for third-party, user-created add-ons available for installation, which can add both fictional and real objects. Add-ons are commonly made up of plain text files, textures, and occasionally 3D models. Celestia also uses the custom CEL scripting language, and improved CELX scripts written in the Lua programming language, which can execute many different commands.

== Limitations ==
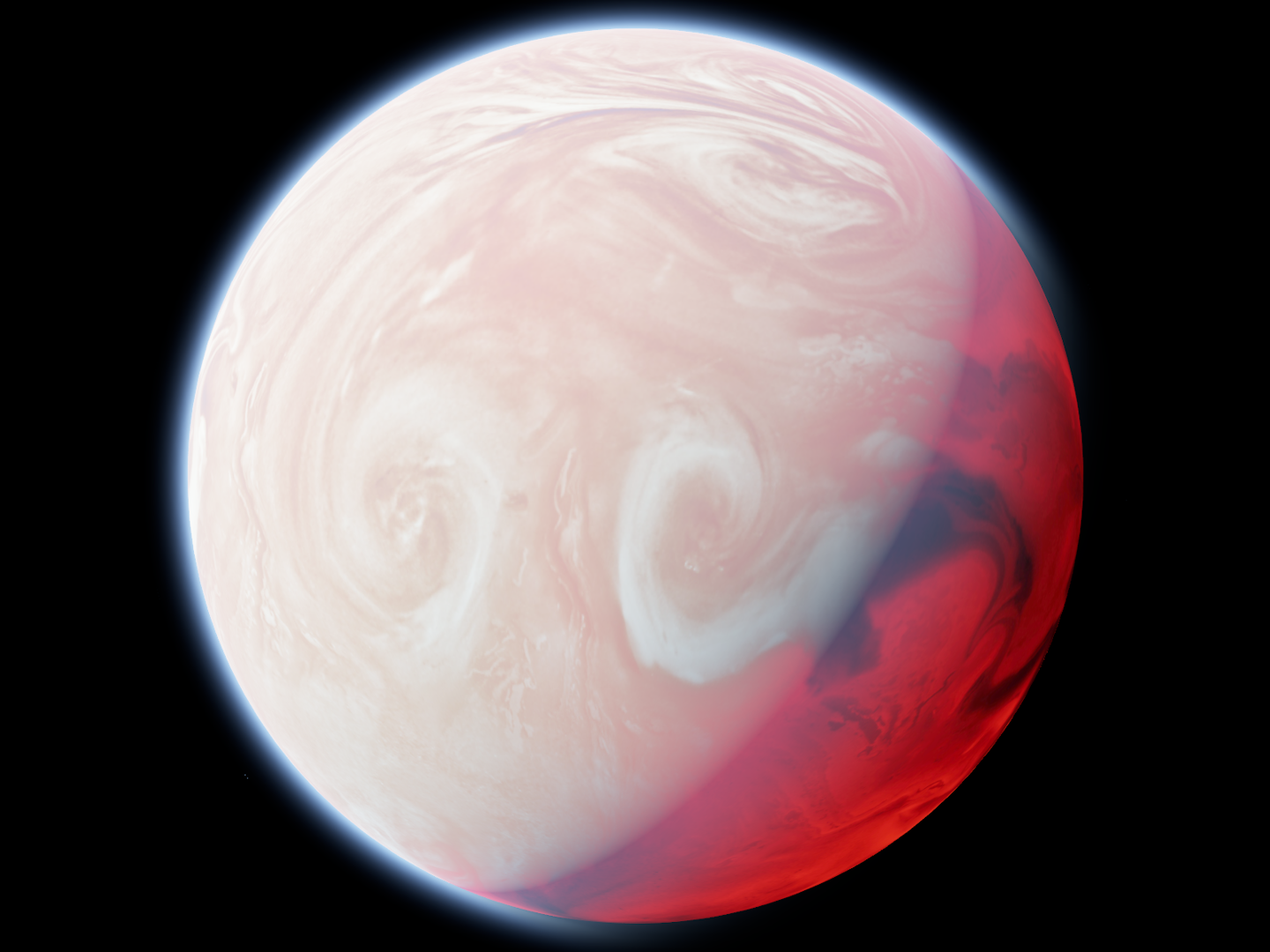
TrES-4 Ab as depicted in Celestia 1.7.0

The default setting for Celestia's Earth is a spheroid. The irregular surface of the Earth causes low Earth orbit satellites to appear to be in the wrong places in the sky when watched from the surface, even when the Earth's oblateness is specified, as Celestia does not simulate 3D surfaces.

Many types of astronomical objects are not included with Celestia. Variable stars, supernovae, black holes, and nebulae are missing from the standard distribution. Many of these are available as add-ons.

Although objects that form part of a planetary system move, and stars rotate about their axes and orbit each other in multiple star systems, stellar proper motion is not simulated, and galaxies are at fixed locations. As a result, the constellations in Celestia do not gradually change shape as they do in the real world. In addition, Celestia's binary star catalogs only describe a few hundred systems of multiple stars. Most binary star systems cannot be simulated with 100% accuracy because adequate orbital information is not yet available.

Celestia does not include any stars that are more than a few thousand light-years from the Sun because the parallaxes of more distant stars are too small to be accurately measured by the Hipparcos astrometric satellite. However, with the addition of Gaia data in 1.7.0, stars as far away as the Galactic Center are included. In addition, objects in star systems are only drawn to a distance of one light-year from their parent stars, any further and they will simply not be rendered at all. Similarly, there is a render limit for stars at 10 million light-years in versions 1.6.4 and under, increased to 1 billion light-years in 1.7.0. Any stars beyond that limit are not rendered, and stars that are close to the 1.7.0 render limit experience floating point errors, meaning their position is inaccurate. Finally, Celestia does not consider the wobbling of some stars induced by their planets, unless said wobbling is very noticeable.

Wavelength filtering is not implemented in Celestia's engine. The actual rendering tries to match human vision at the observer's position as accurately as possible. This means false-color maps and multi-color nebulae are not part of the official distribution, but many are available as add-ons. Camera artifacts such as lens flare and glare are not rendered.

Celestia also does not simulate gravity. For example, a near-Earth object approaching the Earth will not be deflected by the Earth's gravity unless the person who defined the NEO's trajectory for Celestia included that effect, or used an XYZV file.

Some moons do not cast shadows on their planet during eclipses. This is because irregularly shaped objects do not cast shadows in the current version of Celestia, although this is planned for future versions. Additionally, moons smaller than 0.5% of their parent objects' size do not cast shadows at all, as the original development team decided that they would be too small to be relevant. However, the new development team has considered removing this hard-coded limit.

Most real-world spacecraft such as Voyager 2 are not available in Celestia but are provided as add-ons by users. Additionally, most of the spacecraft included with Celestia 1.6.4 use outdated or low-quality models, such as the stock Mir model which is very basic and barely detailed, and the stock ISS model which hasn't had an update since around 2007, meaning it is missing a lot of modules that have been added to the ISS since then. However, there are many add-ons that replace these models with higher-quality and more up-to-date ones, and version 1.7.0 includes better models.

Celestia uses the Julian calendar and cannot go back or forward more than 2 billion years.

== Add-ons ==
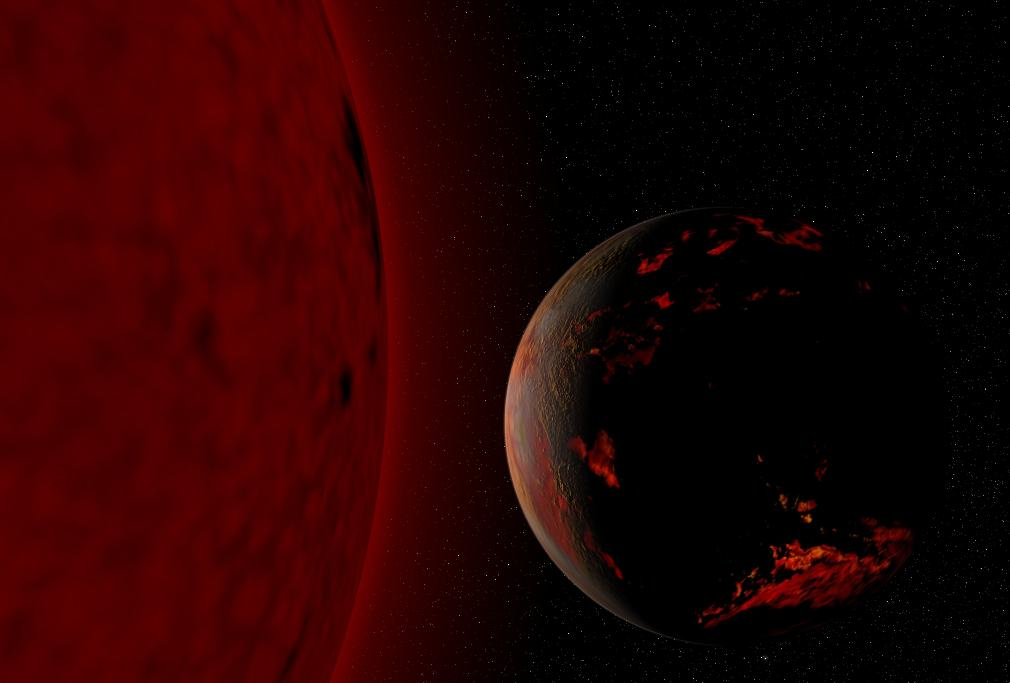
Possible Earth 5 billion years from now when the Sun goes red giant

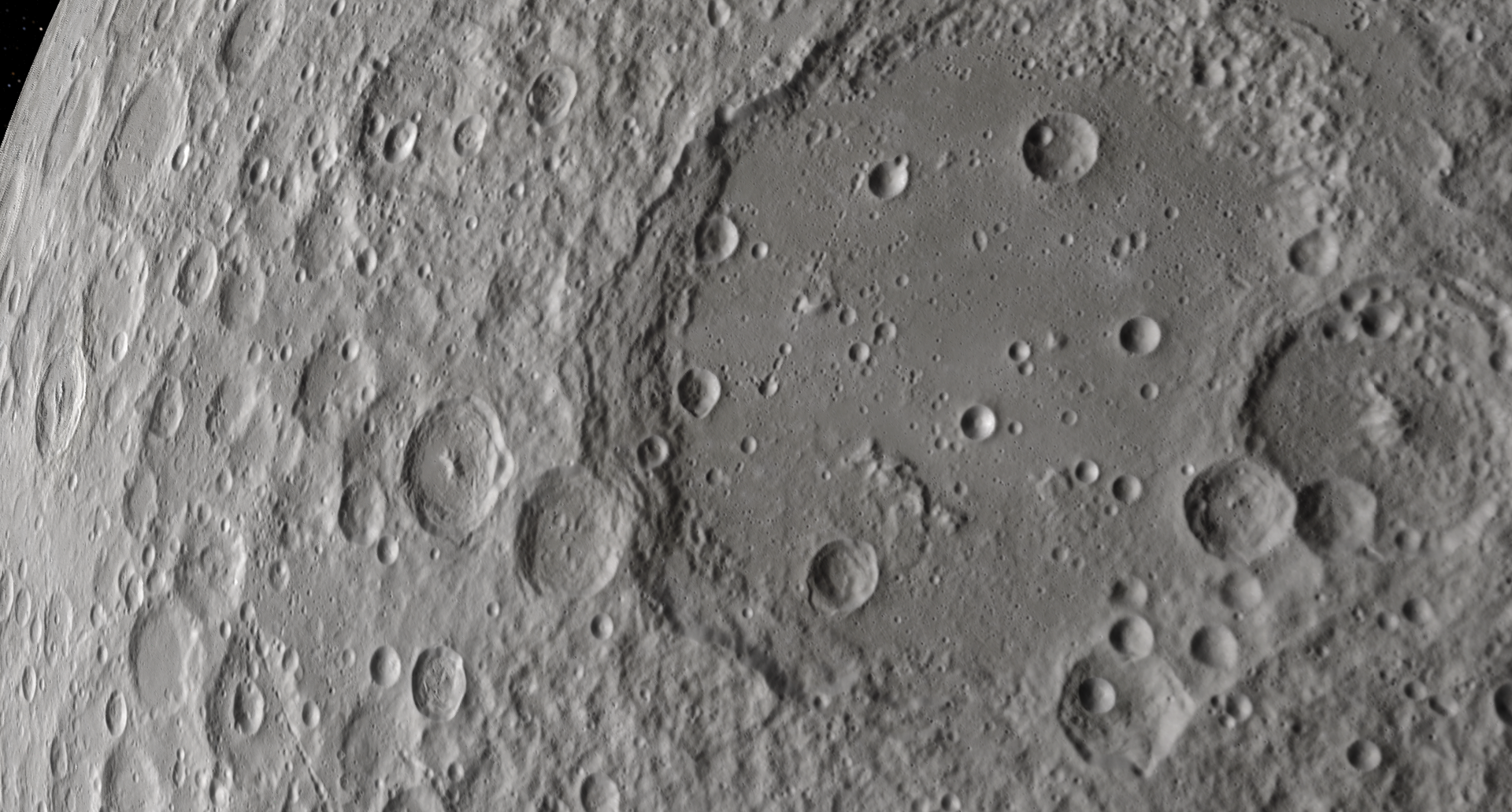
The Moon close-up, with a 64K VT (Virtual Texture) applied

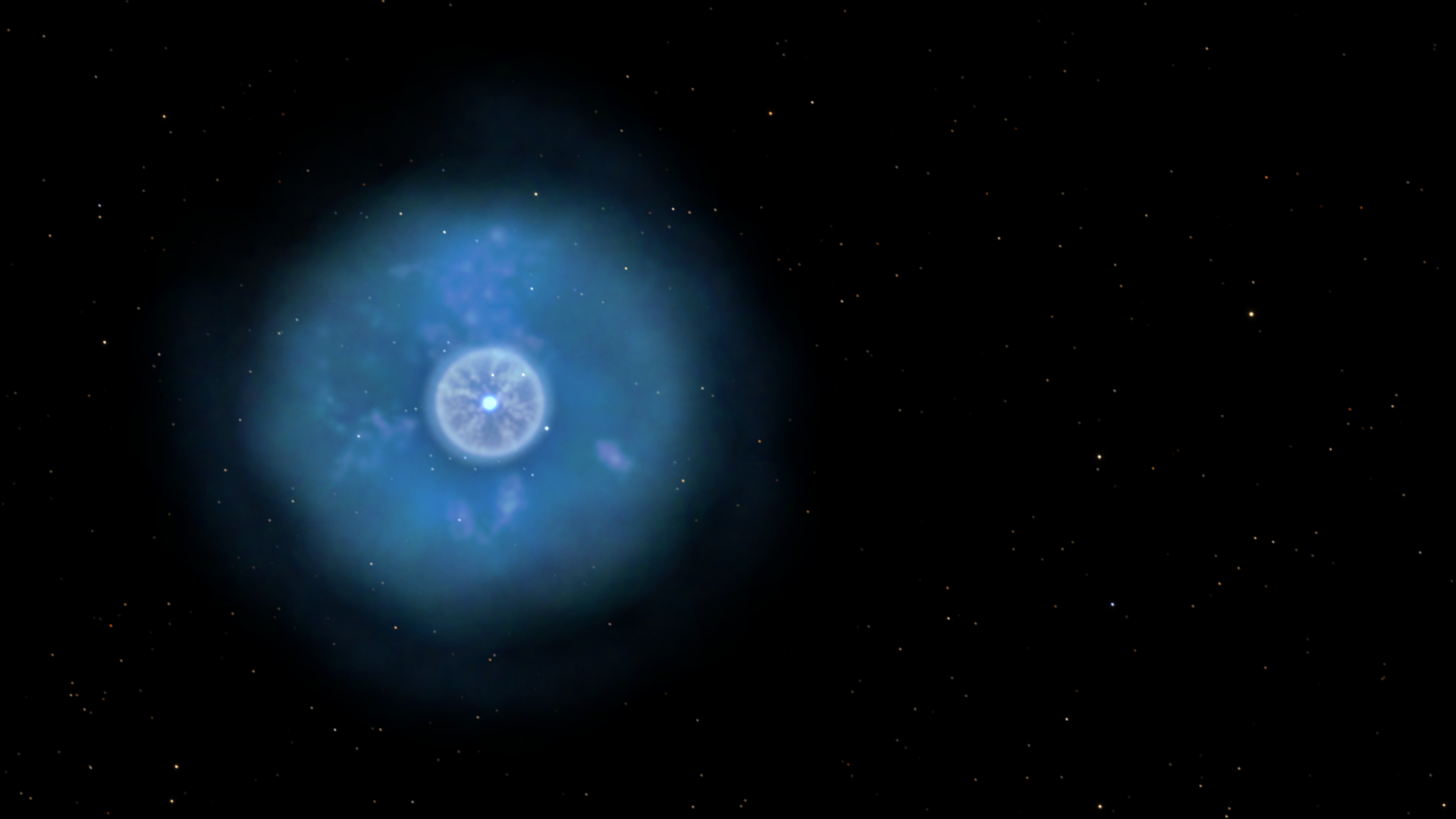
An example of a user-created add-on which adds the nebula NGC 4361

Well over 80 GB of extensions are available in addition to the base program, produced by an active user community.

Higher resolution surface textures are available for most Solar System bodies, including Virtual Textures with coverage up to 65536 pixels wide (0.625 km/pixel at the Earth's equator), with selected coverage at higher resolutions. This allows closer views of well-mapped objects that have high-resolution VTs available for download. 3D models of historical and existing spacecraft are available flying in reasonably accurate trajectories, such as Sputnik 1, Voyager 2, the Hubble Space Telescope, and the International Space Station, as are extended data plots for stars (2 million with correct spatial coordinates), DSOs (nebulae, galaxies, open clusters, etc.), as well as catalogs of asteroids and comets, and more than 96,000 locations on the Earth can be drawn by the program. Add-ons also include other objects such as red and blue supergiants, red and brown dwarfs, neutron stars, spinning pulsars, rotating black holes with accretion disks, protostars, Wolf-Rayet stars, star nursery nebulae, supernova remnants, planetary nebulae, galactic redshifts, geological planetary displays (e.g. 3D interiors, topographic and bathymetric maps, paleogeography), planetary aurorae, rotating magnetic fields, animated solar prominences, 3D craters and mountains, and historic collision events (Either spacecraft such as Deep Impact and DART, or meteoric impacts such as the Chelyabinsk meteor).

Numerous scripts are available. These include simple tours, reconstructions of complex space missions such as Cassini–Huygens and Deep Impact, and scripts showing useful information, like size comparisons, or particular events such as multiple simultaneous eclipses of Jupiter's moons or the evolution of a star.

Fictional universes can be depicted, with planetary systems and 3D models—films such as 2001: A Space Odyssey, Star Trek and Star Wars, and TV shows including Stargate SG-1 and Babylon 5. Add-ons illustrating less well-known internet fiction, like Orion's Arm, or role-playing games, like 2300 AD, and personal works by members of the Celestia community depicting fictional planetary systems with inhabited worlds, spacecraft, cities, and special effects can also be added.

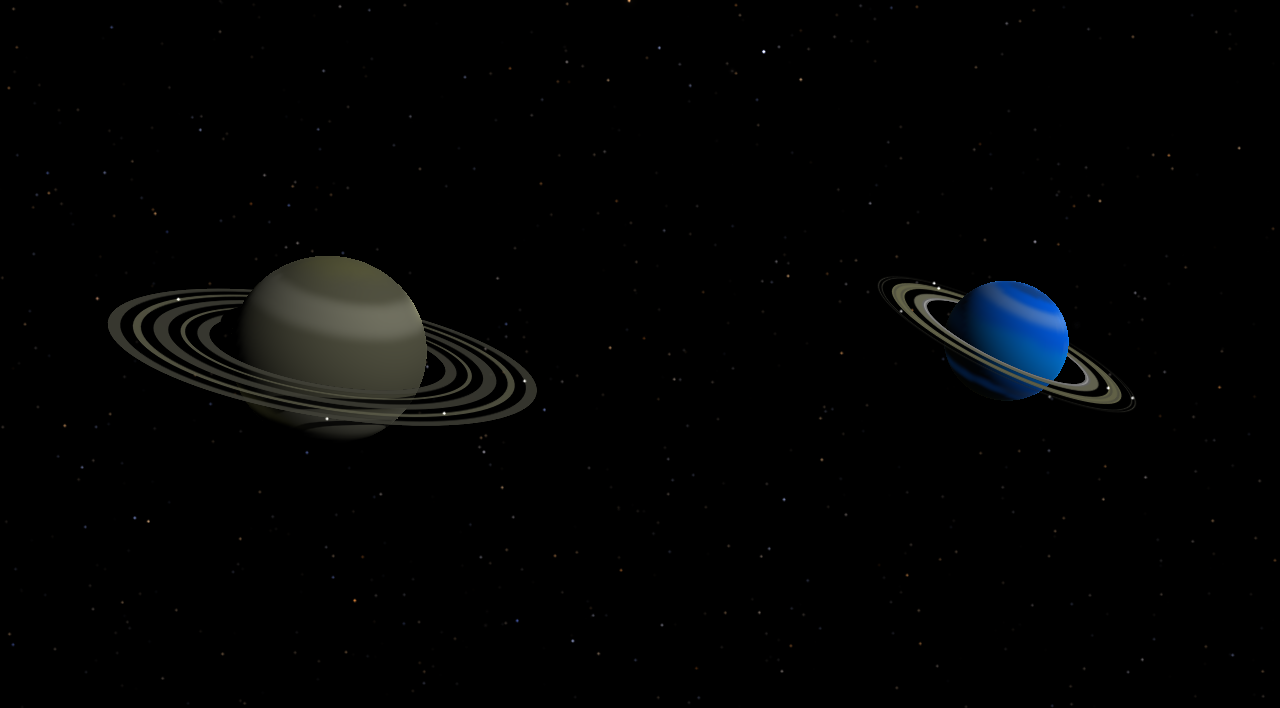
An example of a user-made fictional planetary system in Celestia

Educational add-ons can also be implemented in different languages. These activities provide approximately 40 hours of space journeys and astronomical lessons to include extensive tours of the Celestia universe, the complete life cycle of stars, the Solar System, the human space program, the Search for Extraterrestrial Intelligence (SETI), and depictions of astronomical events such as the formation of the Moon billions of years ago, and the possible terraforming of Mars in the future. (Note: Installation instructions for the add-ons are available on the Wikibooks page.)

In mid 2016, a large addon pack project called Celestia Origin was created, which replaces all vanilla textures and graphics with higher-quality renderings, adds more minor objects such as TNOs and asteroids, while also adding more extrasolar planets with custom textures, more nebulae with full 3D and accurate models, more stars and galaxies, more star clusters, more spacecraft, and a ton of more enhancements. In 2019, Celestia Forum member FarGetaNik created an addon pack called Project Echoes, featuring higher-quality renderings that replace all vanilla textures. Celestia 1.7.0 appears to use Project Echoes as inspiration for its textures.

== Uses in media ==
NASA and ESA have used Celestia in their educational and outreach programs, as well as for interfacing to trajectory analysis software. The French Space Agency (CNES) created a heavily modified version of Celestia in 2016, called VTS Timeloop, and it has since been used by multiple space agencies, including ESA and CNES themselves.

Celestia was used in the media by the CBS television show NCIS (Season 4, Episode 22: "In the Dark"). Character Timothy McGee explains what Celestia is and how an add-on can allow the user to store a diary within the program, as well. Textures designed by Celestia graphic artists were used in the movie The Day After Tomorrow and the 2008 miniseries The Andromeda Strain. Celestia has also appeared on the Science Channel's Through the Wormhole. Eurogamer's Jim Rossignol named Celestia among a top 20 list of Summer of PC Freeware games in 2006.

== See also ==
- Gravity (software)
- OpenUniverse
- Orbiter (simulator)
- Planetarium software
- SpaceEngine
- Space flight simulation game
  - List of space flight simulation games
- List of observatory software
