= Orbiter (simulator) =

2000 video game

Orbiter Space Flight Simulator
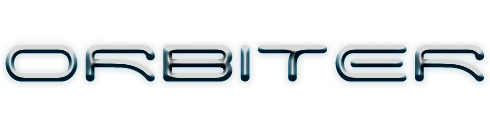

- Screenshot Orbiter simulation of Space Shuttle Atlantis lifting off from Kennedy Space Center Launch Complex 39
- Developer: Martin Schweiger
- Release: 27 November 2000; 25 years ago
- Written in: C++
- Operating system: Windows Vista and later
- Size: 2.7 GB
- Available in: English
- Type: Simulation
- License: MIT license
- Website: www.orbiter-forum.com
- Repository: github.com/mschweiger/orbiter

Orbiter is a space flight simulator video game developed to simulate spaceflight using realistic Newtonian physics. The game was released on 27 November 2000; and the latest edition, labeled "Orbiter 2024", was released on 31 December 2024. The developer, Martin Schweiger, announced to the community that Orbiter is being published under the open source MIT License.

Orbiter was developed by Martin Schweiger, a senior research fellow in the computer science department at University College London, who felt that space flight simulators at the time were lacking in realistic physics-based flight models, and decided to write a simulator that made learning physics concepts enjoyable. It has been used as a teaching aid in classrooms, and a community of add-on developers have created a multitude of add-ons to allow users to fly assorted real and fictional spacecraft and add new planets or planetary systems.

== About the simulator ==
=== Features ===
Orbiter is a realistic physics simulator which allows users to explore the Solar System in a number of spacecraft, both realistic, such as the Space Shuttle Atlantis; and fictional, such as the "Delta-Glider." Schweiger has included fictional spacecraft to allow for easier flights for less experienced users. The simulator is realistic enough to re-enact historical space flights, and the ability to fly fictional ships also allows the player to reach areas of the Solar System that cannot be reached by human spaceflight at the present time.

A spacecraft's engines are defined only by the amount of thrust they put out and amount of fuel they use, allowing anything from solar sails to conventional rocket engines to futuristic nuclear fission and fusion drives to be simulated. Everything between ground movement and interplanetary travel is supported, including orbital and sub-orbital flight, although only vessel-ground collisions are supported. Docking and attachment systems allow the user to simulate docking with a space station or other spacecraft, and rendezvous with and retrieval of satellites. Users can also build space stations in orbit.

The Solar System as presented in Orbiter consists of the Sun, the eight planets and their major moons. Many dwarf planets, asteroids (except Vesta), and comets not included in the simulator are available as add-ons. Although Orbiter contains a database of over 100,000 stars, these are for display purposes only and interstellar travel is currently not possible in the simulator. The simulator also includes a planetarium mode that allows ecliptic and celestial grids to be overlaid onto the star map, along with labels of the constellations and other celestial markers. The planetarium mode can also display labels indicating the location and identity of objects in the Solar System, such as planets, moons, or vessels, that appear within a certain proximity based on their type. This mode can also display labels on the celestial bodies in the Solar System at certain coordinates on their surface for indicating cities, historical markers, geological formations, and other interesting sites.

A Deltaglider docked to the ISS, demonstrating Orbiter's atmospheric visual effects

The traditional simulated control interface in Orbiter consists of two multi-function displays and a head-up display. Each features several modes of operation, with all commands given via the keyboard or mouse. The simulator also supports customized control panels and instruments, including 3-D virtual cockpits and 2-D instrument panels. These allow the player to use the mouse to interact with the panels, and allows more complex systems and instruments that are customized for each ship. The addition of a virtual cockpit also allows the player to freely look around from the perspective of the pilot. Since Orbiter 2006 Patch 1, it has supported TrackIR, which allows the simulator to track the head-movements of the player and adjust the view accordingly.

=== Realism ===
Orbiter was developed as a simulator, with accurately modeled planetary motion, gravitation effects (including non-spherical gravity), free space, atmospheric flight and orbital decay. The position of the planets in the solar system is calculated by the VSOP87 solution, while the Earth-Moon system is simulated by the ELP2000 model. Only n-body Newtonian mechanics are simulated, not taking relativistic effects into account. This means that phenomena such as time dilation due to relativistic effects are not simulated.

The default version of Orbiter before the 2024 edition had no sound, however popular add-ons called OrbiterSound and XRSound are available. Both of them provide engine noises, ambient sounds in the cabin, radio chatter and other sounds including playlists. Both of them contain options to maintain a realistic silence when the craft is viewed externally during spaceflight. There is no collision detection for objects in space, apart from defined docking ports. Since Orbiter 2024, XRSound is now included in the base package, but must be enabled in the launchpad options to function.

Since Orbiter 2016, terrain elevation is modeled for Earth, the Moon, and Mars. Support was also added for higher definition surface textures and clouds.

== Included spacecraft ==
Orbiter's standard distribution includes real and fictional spacecraft and space stations:

=== Real vessels ===
Space Shuttle Atlantis
The Orbiter version of the Space Shuttle Atlantis, a retired Space Shuttle orbiter formerly operated by NASA, and the only player-controllable spacecraft based on a real world design that is included with the basic installation of Orbiter.
Space Station Mir
Orbiter's model of the historic Russian space station. Unlike its real counterpart, it was not deorbited and is placed in an orbit which is closer to the ecliptic plane. This was done initially to make Mir a good origin of interplanetary flights in earlier versions of Orbiter, when Orbiter also automatically refueled spacecraft on docking with a space station. Using the scenario editor, it's still possible to refuel in-flight or start the simulation docked and with full tanks. However, it is possible to move Mir into the correct orbit.
International Space Station
In a similar orbit as the real ISS and in a completed state, it shows modules which are no longer planned to be installed on the real ISS.
Hubble Space Telescope (HST)
A model of the real HST, it gets used together with Orbiter's Space Shuttle Atlantis.
Long Duration Exposure Facility (LDEF) Satellite
Like the Hubble Space Telescope, it's one of the example payloads for Orbiter's Space Shuttle.

=== Fictional vessels ===
The Delta Glider in an orbit around Venus, showing the 3D Virtual Cockpit, including multi-function displays (MFDs) and the head-up display (HUD)

Delta-Glider (DG)
A delta wing spaceplane, which is rather easy to fly and thus good for the first steps into Orbiter. A variant of the Delta-glider is also included, the Delta-Glider-S (DG-S), which trades some of the propellant capacity for a scramjet propulsion system, at the cost of requiring fuel from the main engine fuel tank. It's possible to travel from Earth to Mars with the DG, making it possible to practice interplanetary missions. It is technically a single-stage-to-orbit spaceplane.
Shuttle-A
A small space freighter, which can transport six large cargo containers with a total mass of 120 tonnes (260,000 lb). It does not have an aerodynamic hull so it is at home on the Moon and Mars. While it is possible to launch and land the spacecraft from Earth, particularly when empty, the lack of aerodynamic lift coupled with Earth's high gravity and thick atmosphere make this a difficult and fuel-costly operation. Its cargo containers are however equipped with automatic parachutes. Using the parachutes, it's possible to simulate a cargo run from a lunar base to Earth and back, dropping the cargo while still in the upper atmosphere. Its high inertia and inferior aerodynamics make it harder to fly in an atmosphere than the Delta-glider.
Shuttle-PB
A small personal spacecraft, with high agility and a futuristic performance. As its main purpose is to serve as simple SDK example for add-on developers, it lacks many complex details of other included ships in Orbiter like 2D or 3D cockpits or animations.
Dragonfly
A complex crewed space tug for the construction of space stations. It simulates its various subsystems at a higher complexity than all other standard spacecraft in Orbiter, being a good example of the technical possibilities of Orbiter's SDK. Its flight model is also within the possibilities of current technology, making it a so-called "nearly realistic" spacecraft.
Luna-OB1
A fictional wheel shaped station in lunar orbit, inspired by Space Station V from the beginning of 2001: A Space Odyssey. It consists of a wheel, attached to a central hub with two spokes. The wheel has a diameter of 500 metres (1,600 ft) and is spinning at a frequency of one cycle per 36 seconds, providing its occupants with a centrifugal acceleration of 7.6 m/s^{2} (25 ft/s^{2}).

Carina
A small fictional science satellite, which is used as payload on Orbiter's Space Shuttle. It is a completely inert payload currently. It is based on a proposed European re-entry capsule experiment, to be launched on the Ariane 4, which later resulted in the ARD.

== Orbiter add-ons ==
Orbiter recreation of a launch using an add-on that recreates the Mercury-Atlas 6 mission

An extensive API enables Orbiter users to contribute by creating add-ons. Many spacecraft are available for download as add-ons, ranging from the Soviet Vostok spacecraft to Apollo program. Another popular category of add-ons are modifications of the standard spacecraft of Orbiter, ranging from simple visual changes to complex simulations of the internal subsystems of these fictional crafts. Examples of these more advanced default spacecraft include the XR Series of vessels.

Add-ons are also available for new surface bases, MFD modes, extensions of the simulation menu, space stations, planets, and even other planetary systems. Since Orbiter 2006, a scenario editor is included, which can also be extended for supporting the special attributes of add-on vessels. A third party modlist installer by orbiter-mods.com called Orb can be used to automatically install mod bundles.

== See also ==
- Space flight simulation game
  - List of space flight simulation games
- Microsoft Space Simulator
- Kerbal Space Program
- SpaceEngine
- OpenUniverse
- Celestia
- Systems Tool Kit
