= Space engine =

Space engine may mean:

- Rocket engine, which can be used to propel spacecraft
- SpaceEngine, a 3D astronomy program and game engine
