= Secular variation =

Long-term non-periodic variation

The secular variation of a time series is its long-term, non-periodic variation. Whether a variation is perceived as secular or not depends on the available timescale: a variation that is secular over a timescale of centuries may be a segment of what is, over a timescale of millions of years, a periodic variation. Natural quantities often have both periodic and secular variations. Secular variation is sometimes called secular trend or secular drift when the emphasis is on a linear long-term trend.

The term is used wherever time series are applicable in history, economics, operations research, biological anthropology, and astronomy (particularly celestial mechanics) such as VSOP.

== Etymology ==
The word secular, from the Latin root saecularis ("of an age, occurring once in an age"), has two basic meanings: I. Of or pertaining to the world (from which secularity is derived), and II. Of or belonging to an age or long period. The latter use appeared in the 18th century in the sense of "living or lasting for an age or ages". In the 19th century terms like secular acceleration and secular variation appeared in astronomy, and similar language was used in economics by 1895.

== Astronomy ==
In astronomy, secular variations are distinguished from periodic phenomena. In particular, astronomical ephemerides use secular to label the longest duration or non-oscillatory perturbations in the motion of planets, contrasted with periodic perturbations which exhibit repetition over the course of a given time frame. In this context it is referred to as secular motion. Solar System ephemerides are essential for the navigation of spacecraft and for all kinds of space observations of the planets, their natural satellites, stars and galaxies.

Most of the known perturbations to motion in stable, regular, and well-determined dynamical systems tend to be periodic at some level, but in many-body systems, chaotic dynamics result in some effects which are unidirectional (for example, planetary migration).

=== Solar System ===
Secular phenomena create variations in the orbits of the Moon and the planets. The solar emission spectrum and the solar wind follow secular trends due to migration through the galactic plane. Consensus has determined these to have been among the smallest of factors to influence climate and extinction during human evolution, dwarfed by complex solar cycles and magnetic cycles.

==== Moon ====
The secular acceleration of the Moon depends on tidal forces. It was discovered early but it was some time before it was correctly explained.

==== Earth ====
Depending on the time frame, perturbations can appear secular even if they are actually periodic. An example of this is the precession of the Earth's axis considered over the time frame of a few hundred or thousand years. When viewed in this timeframe the so-called "precession of the equinoxes" can appear to be a secular phenomenon since the axial precession takes 25771.5 years. Thus monitoring it over a much smaller timeframe appears to simply result in a "drift" of the position of the equinox in the plane of the ecliptic of approximately one degree per 71.6 years, influencing the Milankovitch cycles.

==== Planets ====
Secular variation also refers to long-term trends in the orbits of all of the planets. Several attempts have from time to time been undertaken to analyze and predict such gravitational deviations for planets, observing ordinary satellite orbits. Others are referred to as post-keplerian effects.

Variations Séculaires des Orbites Planétaires (VSOP) is a modern numerical model that tries to address the problem.

== Market trends ==
In economics market trends are the upward or downward movement of a market, during a period of time and in the financial field are classified as secular, primary and secondary for long, medium and short time frames.

== Geomagnetic secular variation ==
Geomagnetic secular variation refers to some changes in the Earth's magnetic field. The field has variations on timescales from milliseconds to millions of years – its rapid ones mostly come from currents in the ionosphere and magnetosphere. The secular variations are those over periods of a year or more, reflecting changes in the Earth's core. Phenomena associated with these include geomagnetic jerk, westward drift and geomagnetic reversals.

== Biological anthropology ==
A secular trend, widely tapered off and in some places ended, in which case a discrete developmental shift, has been found to apply across the continents in the average age of onset of puberty (menarche/first menstruation and beginning of breast development) of girls from the 1940s to 2010s: beginning roughly 4 months earlier per decade. This is largely believed to be caused by nutritional changes in children over time.
