= Fabien Chéreau =

French computer programmer and computational astronomer

- Born: September 17, 1980 (age 46); Villefranche-sur-Saône, France
- Education: Lycée du Val de Saône; Tampere University of Technology; National Institute of Applied Sciences
- Occupation: Programmer
- Years active: 2000–present
- Known for: Stellarium

Fabien Chéreau (born 17 September 1980 in Villefranche-sur-Saône, France) is a French research engineer and computer programmer best known for authoring the planetarium software Stellarium, a free, open source astronomy software package which renders 3D photo-realistic skies in real time.

He previously worked as a Research Engineer at the Paris Observatory for the satellite Gaia of European Space Agency on a CNES-funded position for the On-board Detection and the Radial Velocity Spectrometer working groups. He worked in ESO on a plugin for Stellarium, called VirGO, from April 2008 to 2010.

Chéreau wrote the first version of the Gaia on-board detection algorithm. He worked on the definition of the Spectro sky mappers and was in charge of the development of the algorithms for these instruments.

== Education ==
After graduating from Lycée du Val de Saône, Trévoux in Science with majors in Maths, Physics, Chemistry and Industrial Technology, he enrolled in INSA, the French engineering university at Lyon in France. Later he studied his final year as an exchange student in the Tampere University of Technology, Finland. Chéreau achieved his master's degree (Diplôme d'Ingénieur) in Computer Science at the National Institute of Applied Sciences of Lyon, France.

== Personal projects ==
Since summer 2000, Chéreau is working on the free, open source astronomy software Stellarium in C++/OpenGL during his spare time. He also programmed "The Biotes" an experimental artificial life program (in C++) which experiments with neural networks and evolution algorithms.

== Interests ==
Chéreau's interest in observations, calculations and astronomy helped in the creation of Stellarium.
