= SpaceEngine =

Astronomy computer program

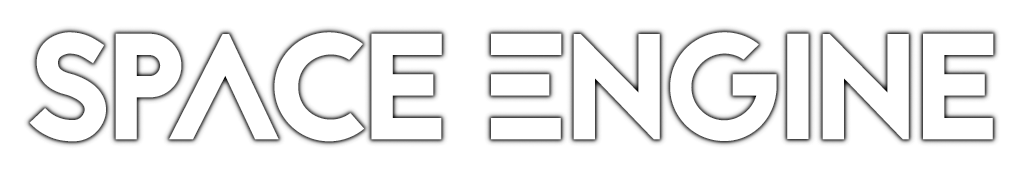
- Logo
- Original author: Vladimir Romanyuk
- Developer: Cosmographic Software
- Release: 0.74 / June 2010
- Stable release: 0.991.49.2095 / 8 December, 2025
- Preview release: 0.991.49.2095 / 3 December, 2025
- Written in: C++ (main program); GLSL (shaders)
- Operating system: Windows 10 and later (64-bit); Linux (planned); macOS (planned)
- Size: 4 GB (software only) to 50 GB (with all optional DLCs: Solar System HD texture packs)
- Available in: More than 20 languages
- List of languages English, Catalan, Croatian, Chinese, Czech, Spanish, Finnish, French, German, Hungarian, Indonesian, Italian, Dutch, Norwegian, Polish, Portuguese, Romanian, Russian, Slovak, Swedish, Armenian, Turkish, Japanese, Korean, etc.
- Type: Space simulation
- License: Proprietary
- Website: spaceengine.org

SpaceEngine is an interactive 3D planetarium and astronomy software initially developed by Russian astronomer and programmer Vladimir Romanyuk and released in June 2010. Romanyuk and the SpaceEngine team later founded the American game studio Cosmographic Software in Connecticut in February 2022 to continue development.

SpaceEngine creates a 1:1 scale three-dimensional planetarium representing the entire observable universe, combining real astronomical data with scientifically accurate procedural generation algorithms. Users can travel through space in any direction or at any speed and can move forwards or backwards in time. SpaceEngine is currently in beta status. Up to version 0.9.8.0E, released in August 2017, it was available as freeware for Microsoft Windows. Version 0.990 beta, the first paid edition, was released on Steam in June 2019. The program fully supports VR headsets.

Properties of objects, such as temperature, mass, radius, and spectrum, are presented on the HUD and in an accessible information window. Users can observe a wide range of celestial objects, from small asteroids and moons to large galaxy clusters, similar to other simulators like Celestia, OpenSpace, Gaia Sky, and Nightshade NG. The default version of SpaceEngine includes over 130,000 real objects, featuring stars from the Hipparcos catalog, galaxies from the NGC and IC catalogs, many well-known nebulae, and all known exoplanets and their stars.

== Functionality ==
The UI of SpaceEngine, showing a procedurally generated Earth-like planet with large but faint planetary rings

The proclaimed goal of SpaceEngine is scientific realism, and to reproduce every type of known astronomical phenomenon. It uses star catalogs along with procedural generation to create a cubical universe over 10 billion parsecs (32.6 billion light-years) on each side, roughly centered on the barycenter of the Solar System. Within the software, users can use search tools to filter through astronomical objects based on certain characteristics. In the case of planets and moons, specific environmental types, surface temperatures, and pressures can be used to filter through the vast amount of different procedurally generated worlds.

SpaceEngine also has a built-in flight simulator (currently in Alpha) which allows for users to spawn in a selection of fictional spacecraft which can be flown in an accurate model of orbital mechanics and also an atmospheric flight model when entering the atmospheres of the various planets and moons. The spacecraft range from small SSTO spaceplanes, to large interstellar spacecraft which are all designed with realism in mind, featuring radiators, fusion rockets, and micrometeorite shields. Interstellar spacecraft simulate the hypothetical Alcubierre drive, including the relativistic effects that would occur in reality.

=== Catalog objects ===
The real objects that SpaceEngine includes are the Hipparcos catalog for stars, the NGC and IC catalogs for galaxies, all known exoplanets, and prominent star clusters, nebulae, and Solar System objects including some comets and asteroids.

=== Procedurally generated objects ===
Objects that are procedurally generated in Space Engine are aimed to be as realistic as possible. The objects include galaxies, star clusters (open and globular), nebulae and individual stars, containing terrestrial planets and gas giants and moons. These objects, like non-procedurally generated objects, can be saved manually by the user and searched for.

=== Wiki and locations ===
The software has its own built-in "wiki" database which gives detailed information on all celestial objects and enables a player to create custom names and descriptions for them. It also has a locations database where a player can save any position and time in the simulation and load it again in the future.

=== Extensions ===
SpaceEngine has a fairly large modding community dedicated to expanding on the program's current catalogues, improving things like texture quality, and even improving the program's terrain and cloud generation as a whole (See Rodrigo's Mod). Some SE add-on creators create fictional star systems for their worldbuilding project, others do 3D modelling for spacecraft add-ons, and some do completely different things. These extensions are all available for download from SpaceEngine's Web Forums.

== Limitations ==
Although objects that form part of a planetary system move, and stars rotate about their axes and orbit each other in multiple star systems, stellar proper motion or precession is not simulated, and galaxies are at fixed locations and do not rotate.

Most real-world spacecraft such as Voyager 2 are not provided with SpaceEngine. The few spacecraft that are included do not use real trajectories or accurate orientations, as all bodies are required to follow an orbit that can be modeled with Keplerian elements. However, real-world spacecraft can be downloaded and manually controlled by the end user.

Interstellar light absorption is not modeled in SpaceEngine.

Intrinsic variable stars are not supported by SpaceEngine. In fact, most, if not all, simulators do not support intrinsic variable stars.

Additionally, time dilation is not modelled in SpaceEngine, although gravitational lensing and the Doppler effect are modelled accurately; the 4D shader model uses math from Albert Einstein's work.

Gravity is not simulated in SpaceEngine outside the orbits of moons, planets and stars in a system, with the exception of the controllable spacecraft.

Planetary collisions are not simulated, though you can find planets that intersect on their orbits.

== Development ==
Development of SpaceEngine began in 2005, with its first public release in June 2010. The software is written in C++. The engine uses OpenGL as its graphical API and uses shaders written in GLSL. As of the release of version 0.990, the shaders have been encrypted to protect against plagiarism. Plans have been made to start opening them in a way that allows the community to develop special content for the game, with ship engine effects being made available to users who have purchased the game.

On 27 May 2019, the Steam store page for SpaceEngine was made public in preparation for the release of the first paid version, 0.990 beta.

SpaceEngine is currently only available for Windows PCs; however, there are plans for the software to support macOS and Linux in the future. Even though SpaceEngine only natively supports Windows, the Steam version can be run on Linux via Steam's Proton compatibility tool.

== See also ==
- Celestia
- Space flight simulation game
  - List of space flight simulation games
- Planetarium software
- List of observatory software
- List of games with Oculus Rift support
- Gravity (software)
- Google Earth
