= Nightshade (astronomy software) =

Simulation and visualization software

- Developer(s): Digitalis Education Solutions, Inc
- Stable release: Nightshade NG 17.8.1 / 23 August 2017; 7 years ago
- Preview release: Nightshade NG 17.11.1 / 19 November 2017; 7 years ago
- Repository: nightshadesoftware.org/projects/nightshade/files
- Written in: C++, OpenGL, Lua
- Operating system: Cross-platform (Microsoft Windows, macOS, Linux)
- Type: Planetarium, Educational software
- License: Nightshade Public License
- Website: nightshadesoftware.org/

Nightshade is a simulation and visualization software for teaching and exploring astronomy, Earth science, and related topics. Its focus is on use in digital planetarium systems or as an educational tool, with additional features to allow it to also be used on desktop or laptop computers. It operates on Linux, macOS and Windows.

Nightshade Legacy was open source and is no longer developed. A completely new codebase, Nightshade NG (Next Generation) is licensed under the "Nightshade Public License", a non-free license with field of use restrictions but with source available.

== History ==
Nightshade Legacy began as a fork of Stellarium by Digitalis Education Solutions after controversy between the Stellarium project and its commercial contributor about a focus on desktop versus planetarium use. Development of Nightshade Legacy ceased around 2011.

A rewrite, Nightshade NG, was begun in 2011, with a change to a non-free license with field of use restrictions to prevent its use by commercial competitors of Digitalis. Several Nightshade NG "preview releases" have been made.

== Features of Nightshade NG ==
- Sky features
  - The Hipparcos Catalogue with proper 3D positioning, proper motion and radial velocity
  - Extra catalogues with more than 12 million stars
  - Asterisms and illustrations of the constellations from many cultures
  - Images of nebulae (built-in and user added)
  - Realistic Milky Way
  - Physically-based atmosphere allowing for realistic sunrise and sunset from anywhere on or above the Earth or Mars
  - Planets of the Solar System and their major moons
  - Ability to display stars and other celestial objects as seen from any reference point in the Milky Way galaxy
  - Ability to fast-forward or rewind time +/- 1,000,000 years
- Terrain features
  - Ability to add multiple image layers of a planet using Web Map Service or GDAL
  - Ability to display imagery over topography
  - Ultra-high resolution imagery for Earth, Mars, Mercury, Europa, and the Moon
- Interface
  - Zoom
  - Time control
  - Multilingual interface
  - Scripting to record and playback shows
  - Fisheye projection for planetarium domes
  - Graphical interface and extensive keyboard control
  - Text user interface for planetarium domes
  - Web-based graphical console for control from any Firefox or Mobile Safari device
- Visualization
  - Equatorial, azimuthal, J2000, and galactic grids
  - Star twinkling
  - Shooting stars
  - Eclipse simulation for any body
  - Skinnable landscapes
  - Spherical panorama projection
- Customisability
  - Deep sky objects, landscapes, constellation images, scripts etc. can be added.
  - Stratoscript command syntax to allow for easy macro-style programming
  - Ability to record and playback scripts
