= Stellarium (software) =

Open-source planetarium

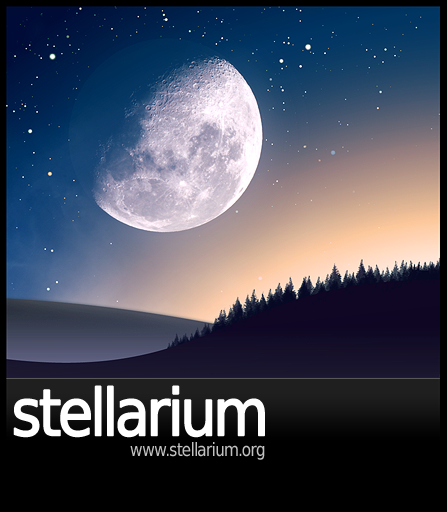

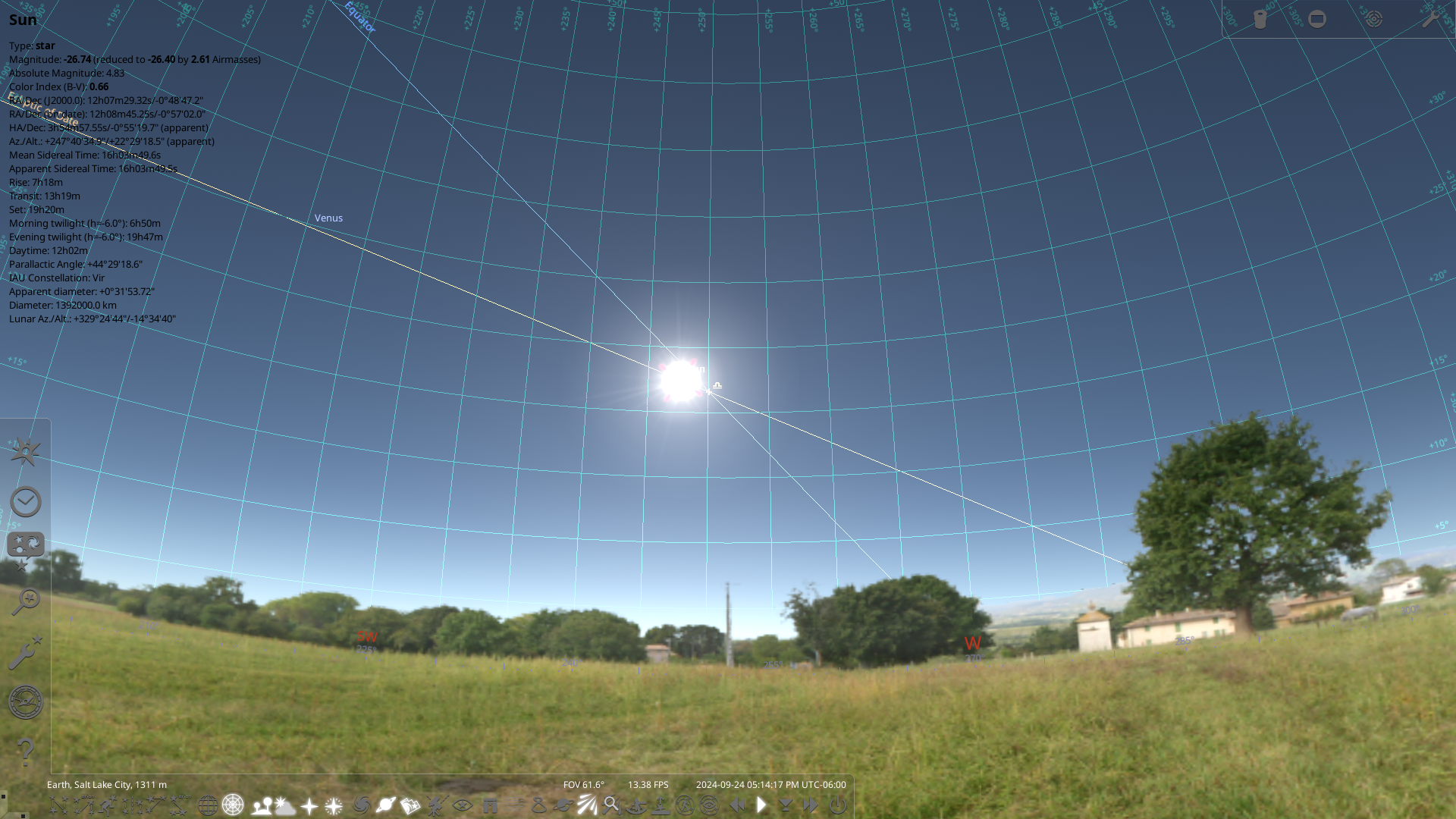
- Stellarium 24.3 running on Windows
- Original author: Fabien Chéreau
- Developers: Alexander Wolf; Georg Zotti; Marcos Cardinot; Guillaume Chéreau; Bogdan Marinov; Timothy Reaves; Florian Schaukowitsch
- Release: 2001
- Stable release: 26.3 / September 28, 2026 (34 days ago)
- Written in: C++ (Qt)
- Operating system: Linux, Windows, macOS
- Platform: PC, Mobile
- Size: 345 MB (Linux tarball); 261 MB (Windows 32-bit installer); 398 MB (Windows 64-bit installer); 243 MB (macOS package)
- Type: Educational software
- License: GNU GPLv2
- Website: stellarium.org
- Repository: github.com/Stellarium/stellarium

Stellarium is a free and open-source planetarium, licensed under the terms of the GNU General Public License version 2 or any later version, available for Linux, Windows, and macOS. A port of Stellarium called Stellarium Mobile is available for Android and iOS. These have a limited functionality, lacking some features of the desktop version. All versions use OpenGL to render a realistic projection of the night sky in real time.

Stellarium was featured on SourceForge in May 2006 as Project of the Month.

== History ==
In 2006, Stellarium 0.7.1 won a gold award in the Education category of the Les Trophées du Libre free software competition.

A modified version of Stellarium has been used by the MeerKAT project as a virtual sky display showing where the antennae of the radio telescope are pointed.

In December 2011, Stellarium was added as one of the "featured applications" in the Ubuntu Software Center.

Stellarium 25.1, released in March 2025, was the first version of Stellarium to use data from the Gaia DR3 catalogue. Stellarium 25.1 also continued to use Hipparcos data. The faintest stars, down to around magnitude 21, have Gaia DR3 designations, while medium-magnitude stars have HD (Henry Draper), TYC (Tycho), and other designations.

=== Planetarium dome projection ===
The fisheye and spherical mirror distortion features allow Stellarium to be projected onto domes. Spherical mirror distortion is used in projection systems that use a digital video projector and a first surface convex spherical mirror to project images onto a dome. Such systems are generally cheaper than traditional planetarium projectors and fish-eye lens projectors and for that reason are used in budget and home planetarium setups where projection quality is less important.

Various companies which build and sell digital planetarium systems use Stellarium, such as e-Planetarium.

Digitalis Education Solutions, which helped develop Stellarium, created a fork called Nightshade which was specifically tailored to planetarium use.

=== VirGO ===
VirGO is a Stellarium plugin, a visual browser for the European Southern Observatory (ESO) Science Archive Facility which allows astronomers to browse professional astronomical data. It is no longer supported or maintained; the last version was 1.4.5, dated January 15, 2010.

== Stellarium Mobile ==
Stellarium Mobile is a fork of Stellarium, developed by some of the Stellarium team members. It currently targets mobile devices running Symbian, Maemo, Android, and iOS. Some of the mobile optimisations have been integrated into the mainline Stellarium product.

The mobile app includes a sensor feature that allows users to scan the sky, a night vision mode, among other features.

== Screenshots ==
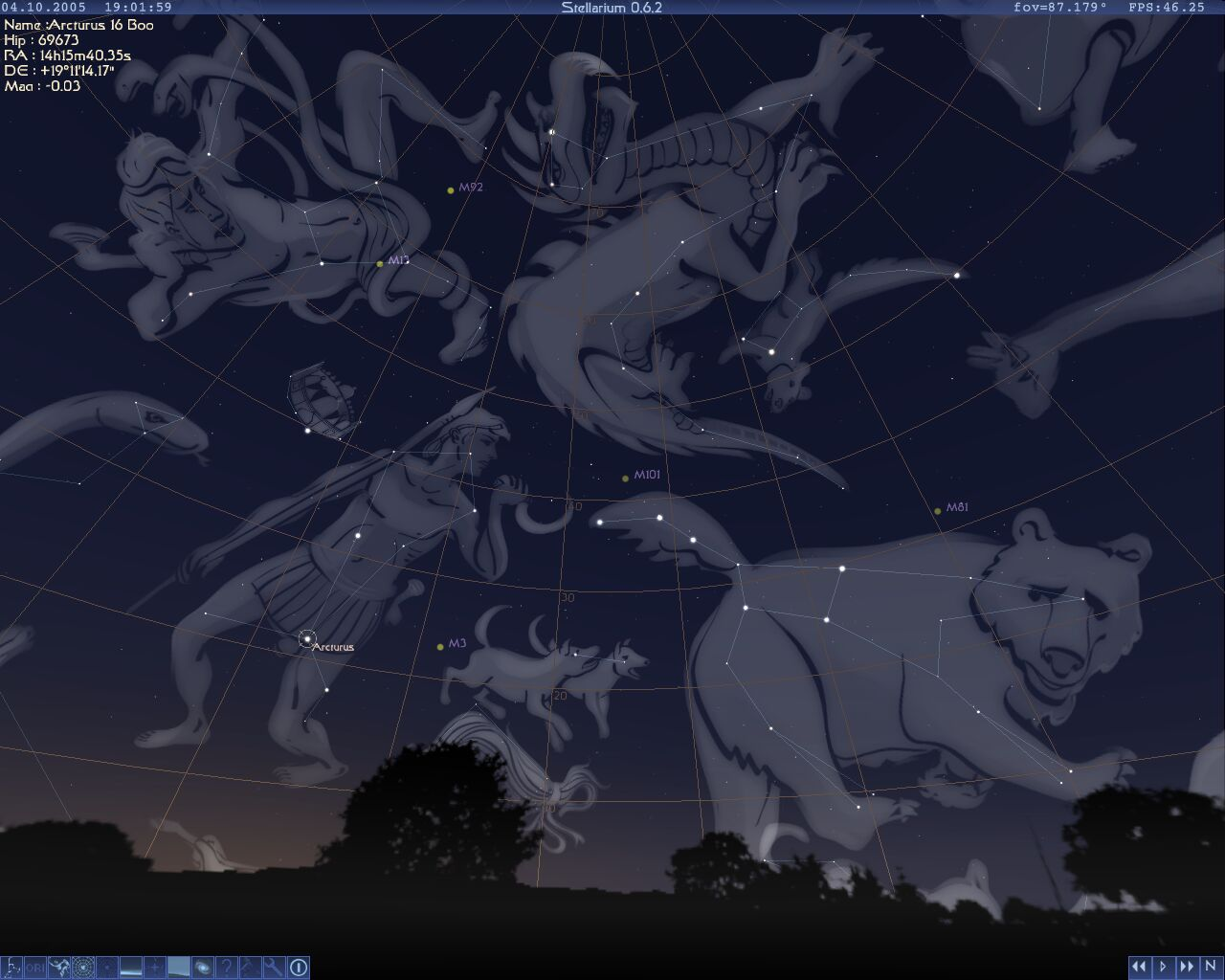
Constellation art in version 0.6.2

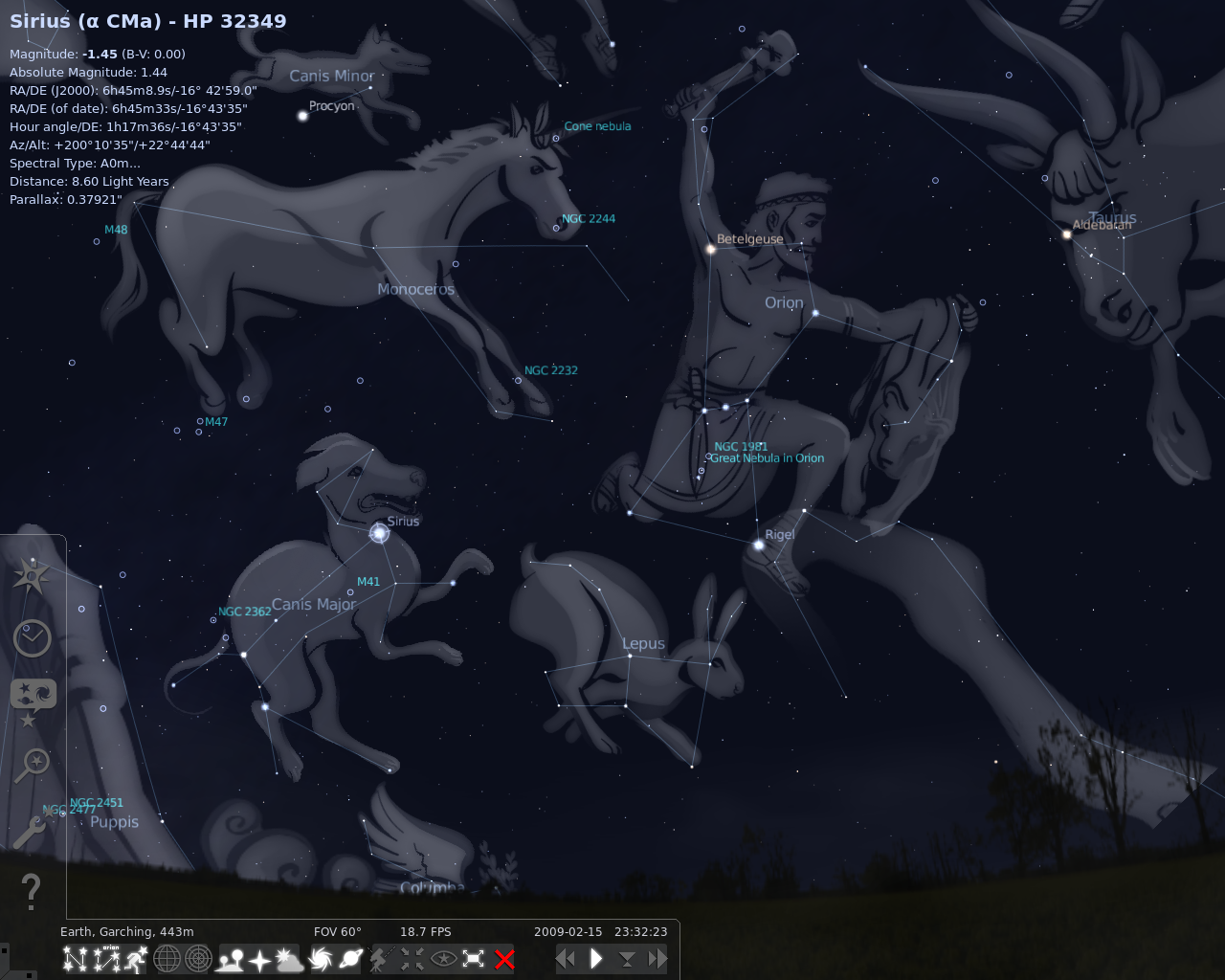
Constellation art in version 0.10.1

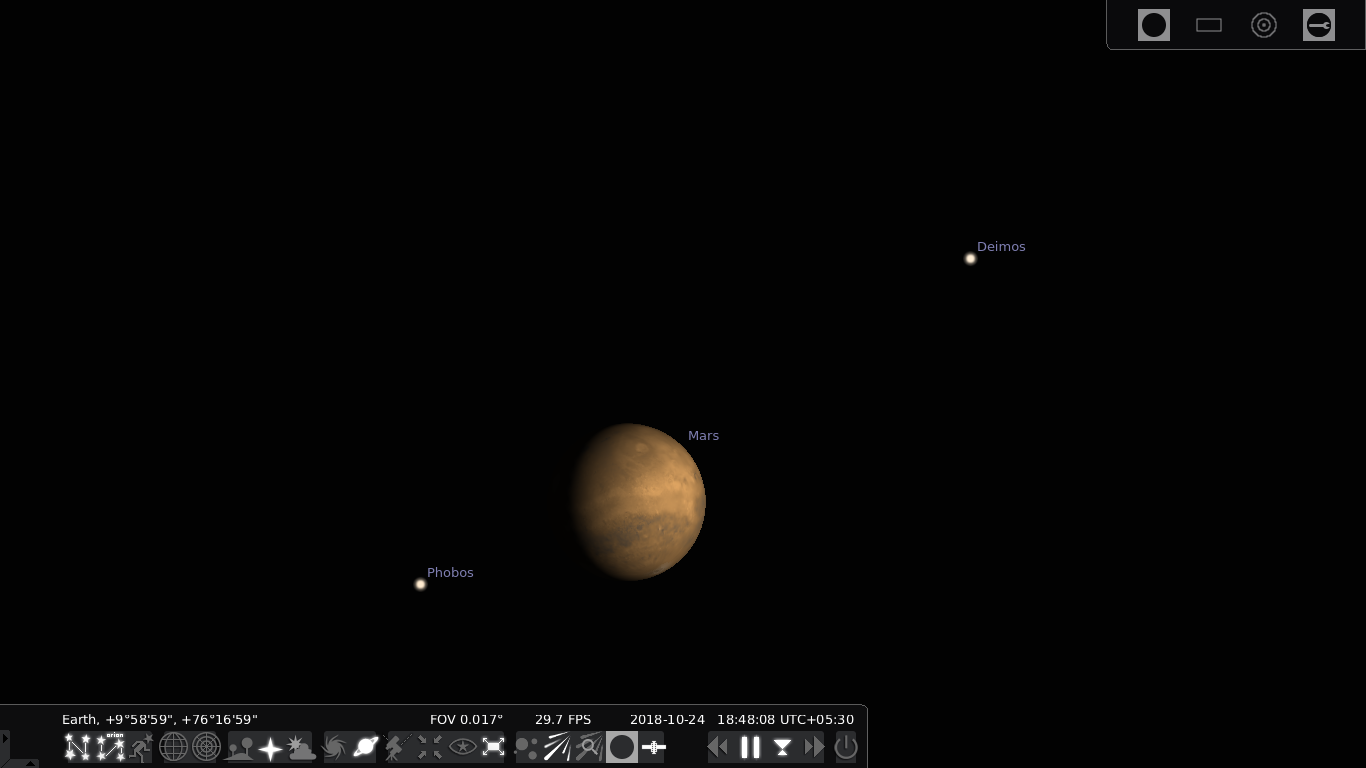
Mars and its moons in Stellarium 0.14

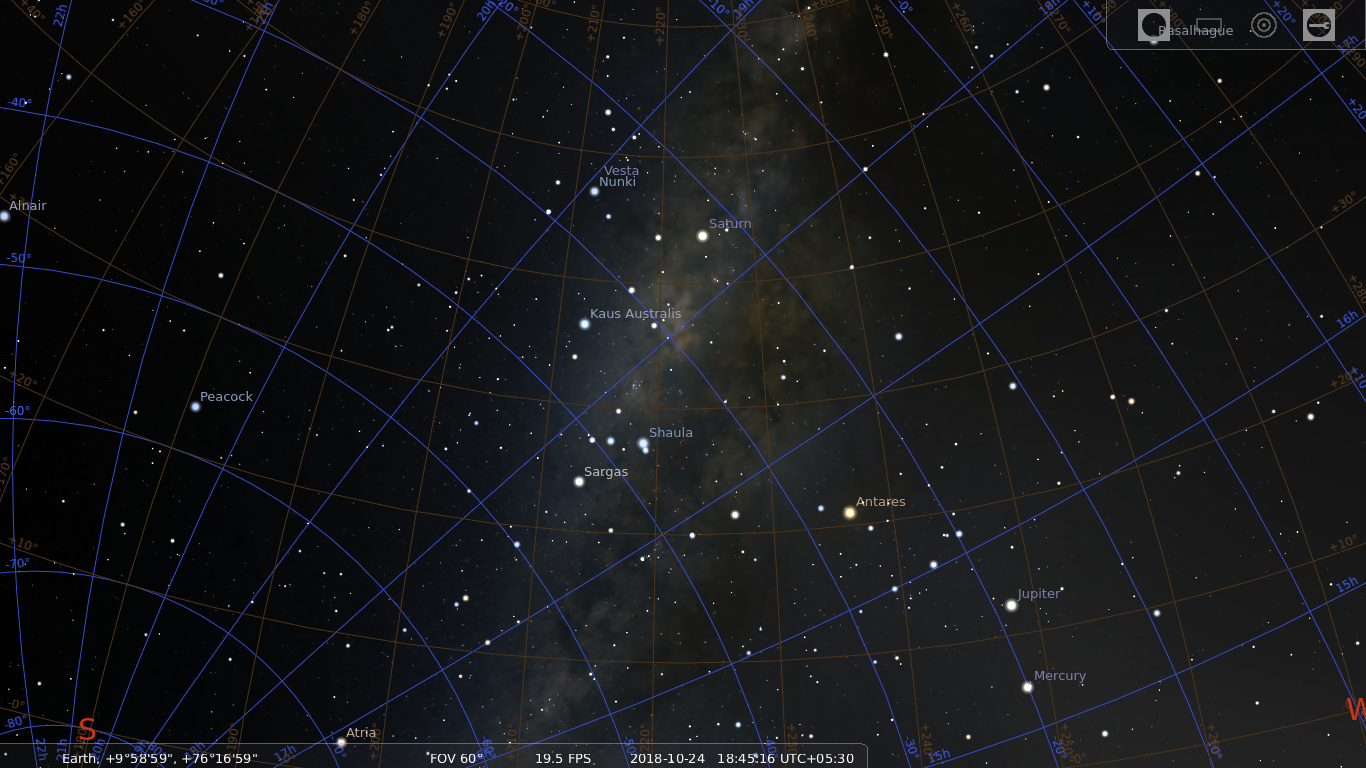
Equatorial and Azimuthal Grids in Stellarium 0.14

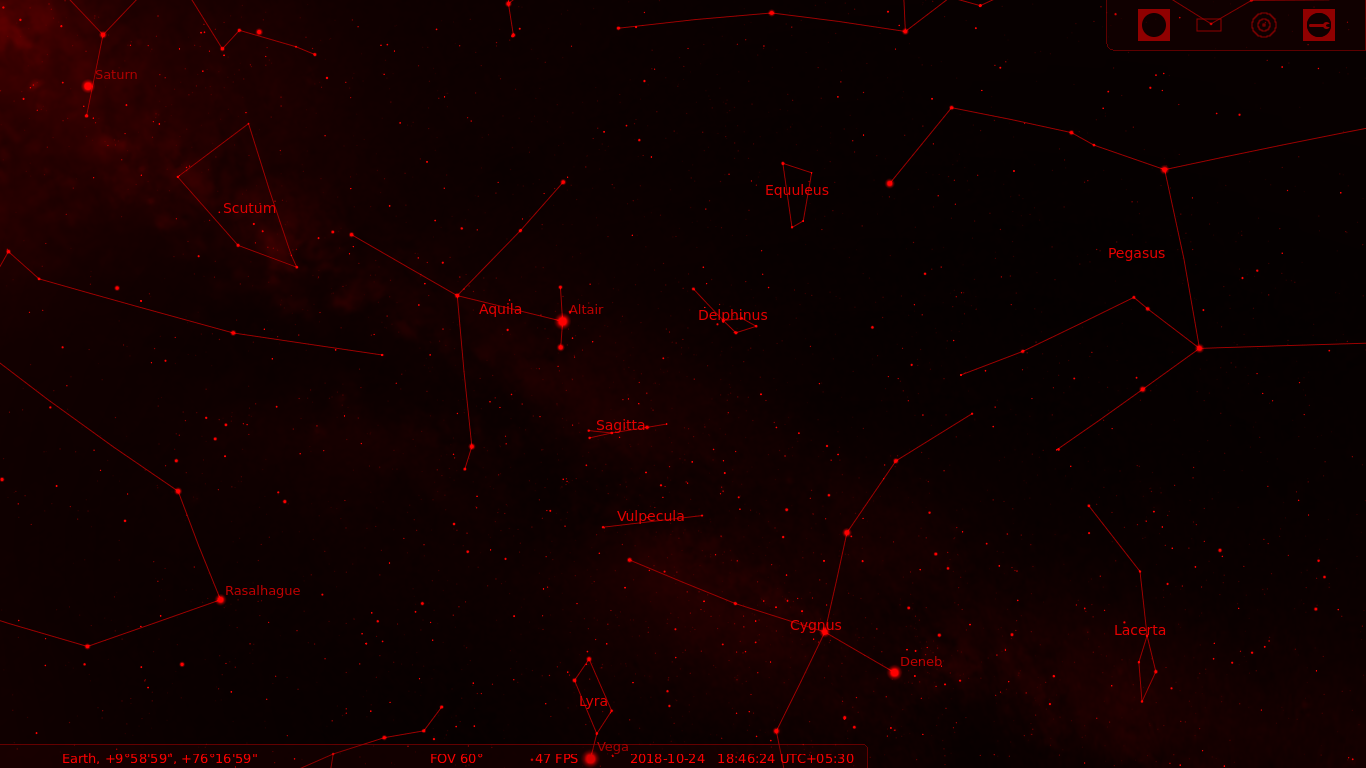
Screenshot of Night Mode in Stellarium 0.14

== Legacy ==
Eleanor Catton, the New Zealand author who wrote the 2013 Booker Prize recipient novel The Luminaries, stated she used star charts from Stellarium and Sky & Telescope while writing the novel to help reconstruct the sky within the timeframe the novel is set in.

== See also ==
- Space flight simulation game
  - List of space flight simulation games
- Planetarium software
- List of observatory software
