= Wilson effect (astronomy) =

Perceived depression in sunspot umbrae

Diagram of the Wilson effect. The umbra is the darker inner circle and the penumbra is the lighter ring around the umbra.

In astronomy, the Wilson effect is the perceived depression of a sunspot's umbra, or center, in the Sun's photosphere. The magnitude of the depression for the umbra is between 500 and 1000 km, with an average of 600 km.

Sunspots result from the blockage of convective heat transport by intense magnetic fields. Sunspots are cooler than the rest of the photosphere, with effective temperatures of about 4,000°C (about 7,000°F). Sunspot occurrence follows an approximately 11-year period known as the solar cycle, discovered by Heinrich Schwabe in the 19th century.

== History ==
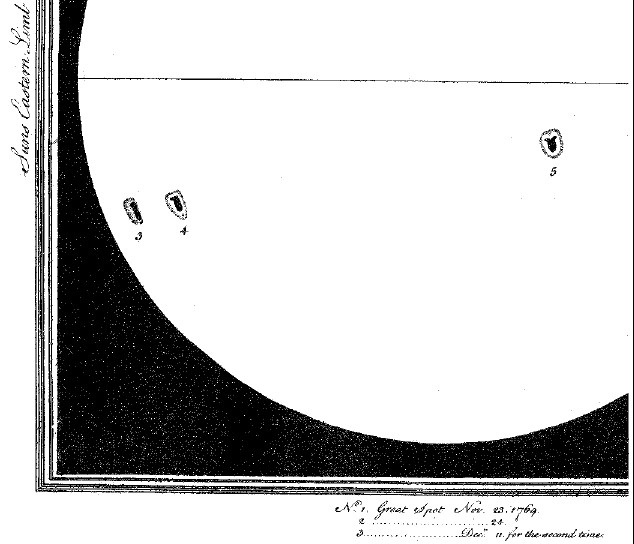
Wilson's original sketch demonstrating the Wilson effect.

In 1769, during solar cycle 2, Scottish astronomer Alexander Wilson, working at the Macfarlane Observatory, noticed that the shape of sunspots noticeably flattened as they approached the Sun's limb due to solar rotation. These observations were published in 1774 and showed that sunspots were features on the solar surface, as opposed to minor planets or objects above it. Moreover, he observed what is now termed the Wilson effect: the penumbra and umbra vary in the manner expected by perspective effects if the umbrae of the spots are in fact slight depressions in the surface of the photosphere.

== Alternative interpretations ==
While the surface-depression interpretation of the Wilson effect is widespread, Bray and Loughhead contended that "the true explanation of the Wilson effect lies in the higher transparency of the spot material compared to the photosphere". A similar interpretation was expressed by C.H. Tong.

== See also ==
- Joy's law (astronomy)
- Spörer's law
- Hale's law
- List of solar cycles
