= Transequatorial loop =

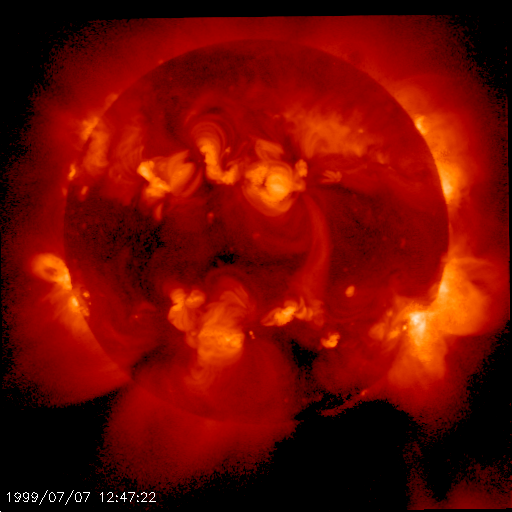
Pictured is the Sun as seen in soft x-ray with a transequatorial loop slightly right of center arcing across the solar equator.

In solar physics, a transequatorial loop is a structure present in the solar corona that connects two different regions of opposite magnetic polarity in opposite hemispheres of the Sun. These connected regions are not limited to active regions, but are most commonly found during the times of maximum solar activity, the solar maximum.

Transequatorial loops play an integral role in the Babcock Model of solar dynamics and are therefore important to the future study of the solar dynamo.

== Babcock Model ==
The idea of transequatorial loops was first developed by Horace W. Babcock in his 1961 model for the 11 year sunspot cycle. It explains that during each cycle, starting around the time of solar minimum, the Sun's internal, poloidal (parallel with the solar meridian) magnetic field is wrapped around the Sun via solar differential rotation. Over time, this process turns the field from primarily poloidal, to primarily toroidal (parallel with the solar equator) until the toroidal field reaches its maximum strength at the solar maximum. In order for it to return to its initial, poloidal state, Babcock theorized that the magnetic field from different hemispheres, which continuously emerges from the inside of the Sun into the solar atmosphere, would reconnect with each other forming transequatorial loops.

After evidence for the existence of transequatorial loops was first observed in Skylab X-ray data, they were found to be more common during solar maximum then during solar minimum in accordance with the Babcock Model.

== Characteristics ==
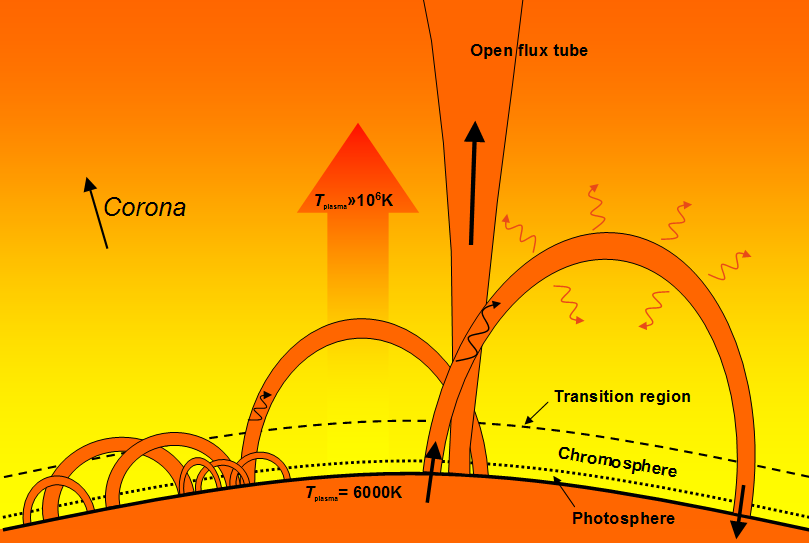
Various examples of coronal loops.

Transequatorial loops connect regions of opposite magnetic polarity on opposite solar hemispheres. Typically, they connect active regions with inactive regions, but can also connect active regions together and inactive regions together. Some regions may possess multiple transequatorial loops. In addition to this, about one third of all active regions possess at least one transequatorial loop and about one third of those possessing one have it associated with the preceding, or westernmost, polarity of the active region.

Transequatorial loops have also been associated with flare activity and coronal mass ejections.

== See also ==
- Solar corona
- Coronal seismology
- Coronal loop
- Solar prominence
