= Hale's law =

Empirical law for solar active regions

Hale's law illustrated with sunspot groups. Each spot is labeled with an N (for North) or an S (for South) indicating its magnetic polarity. Each sunspot group is composed of two spots of opposite polarity with the rightmost leading and the leftmost trailing.

Active regions are often bipolar, with two poles of opposite magnetic polarity rooted in the photosphere.

In solar physics, Hale's law, also known as Hale's polarity law or the Hale–Nicholson law, is an empirical law for the orientation of magnetic fields in solar active regions.

It applies to simple active regions that have bipolar magnetic field configurations where one magnetic polarity is leading with respect to the direction of solar rotation. Hale's law states that, in the same northern or southern solar hemisphere, such active regions have the same leading magnetic polarity; that, in opposite hemispheres, such active regions have the opposite leading polarity; and that, from one sunspot cycle to the next, these polarities reverse. It is named after George Ellery Hale and Seth Barnes Nicholson, whose observations of active-region magnetic fields led to the law's formulation in the early 20th century.

Hale's law, along with Joy's law and Spörer's law, provides observational constraints for models of the solar dynamo, which generates the Sun's magnetic field. Hale's law suggests that active regions originate from a highly organized toroidal magnetic field in the Sun's interior that reverses polarity across the equator and alternates polarity between sunspot cycles.

== History ==
The solar magnetic field was first detected in 1908 by George Ellery Hale, when he showed observationally that sunspots had strong, bipolar magnetic fields. With these observations, Hale also noted that the majority of sunspot groups within the same northern or southern solar hemisphere shared the same leading polarity and that this pattern reversed across the equator. As solar cycle 14 transitioned into solar cycle 15, further observations were carried out by Hale and his collaborators. In 1919, their work revealed that the magnetic polarity of sunspot pairs within both hemispheres reversed from one 11-year sunspot cycle to the next. These patterns became collectively known as Hale's polarity law, or simply Hale's law.

== Definition ==
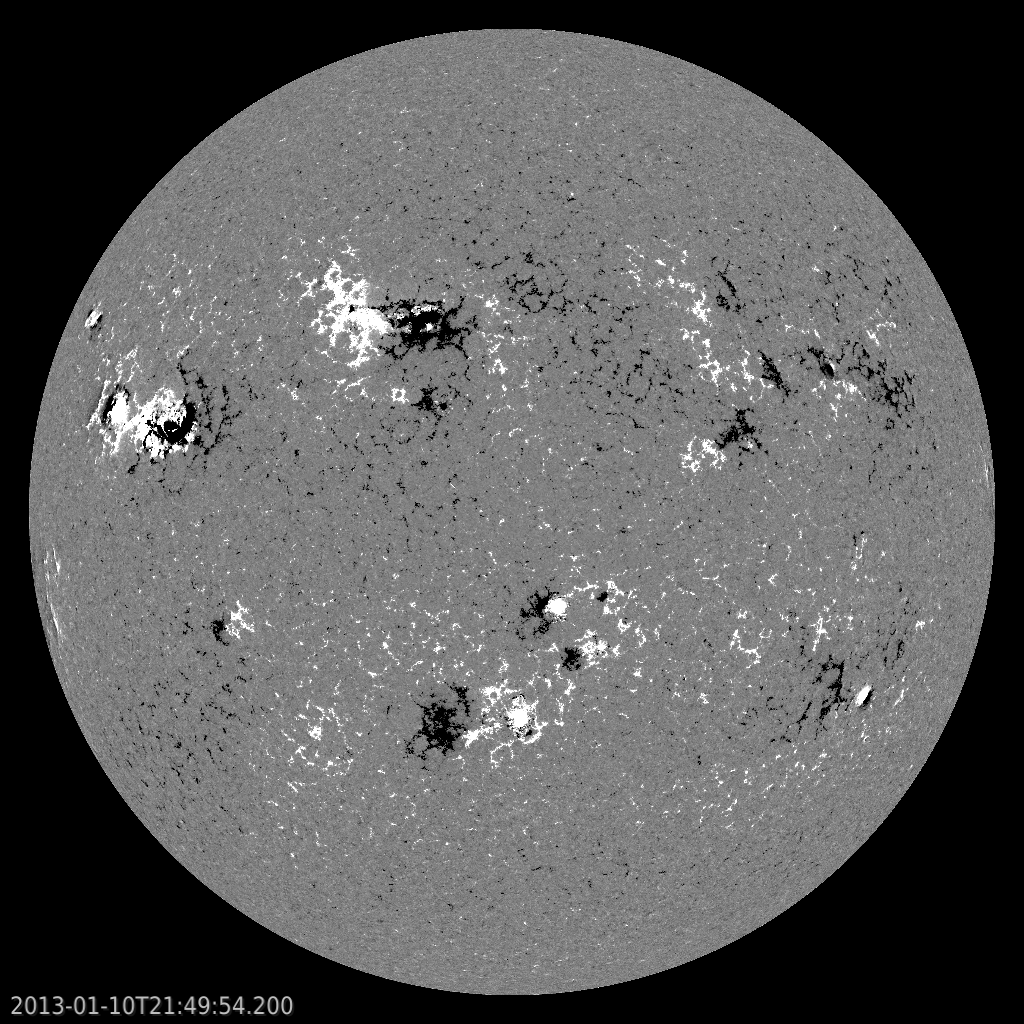
Solar cycle 24

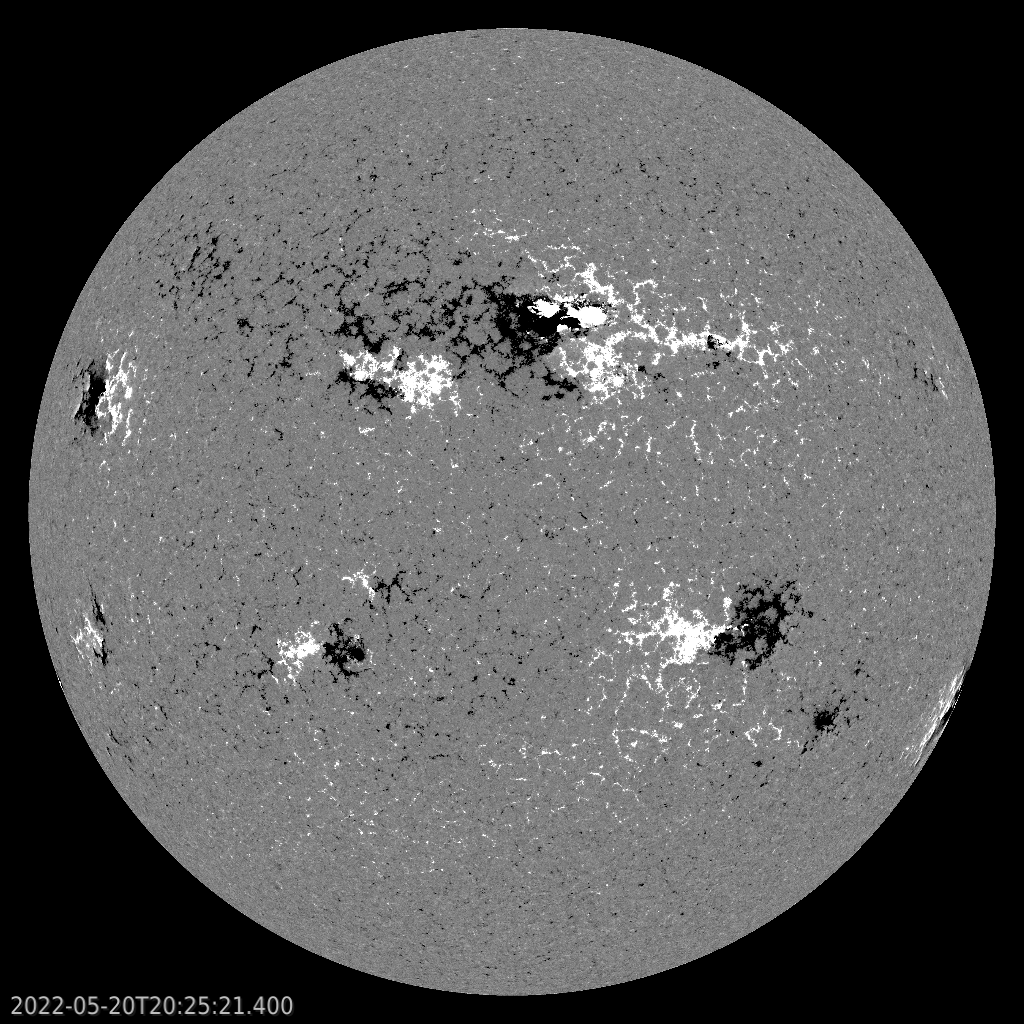
Solar cycle 25

Photospheric magnetograms taken during solar cycles 24 and 25 demonstrate Hale's law. Here, white patches indicate magnetic field lines pointing out of the page, while black patches indicate magnetic field lines pointing into the page. Bipolar active regions appear as pairs of these black and white patches. In these magnetograms, the leading polarity of a given active region is the rightmost polarity.

Hale's law describes the magnetic polarity associated with solar active regions. The magnetic field of most active regions can be approximated by a pair of magnetic monopoles of opposing polarity, in which case the region is referred to as a bipolar active region. These poles are generally oriented so that one pole is leading with respect to the direction of solar rotation and the other is trailing.

Hale's law states that bipolar active regions have the following properties depending on whether the region is located in the northern or southern solar hemisphere:

- In the same hemisphere, regions tend to have the same leading polarity.
- In the opposite hemisphere, regions tend to have the opposite leading polarity.
- Leading polarities in both hemispheres reverse from one sunspot cycle to the next.

=== Anti-Hale regions ===
Bipolar active regions that violate Hale's law are known as anti-Hale regions. Estimates of the percentage of bipolar active regions that violate Hale's law have ranged from 2 to 9%. Small, weak, ephemeral active regions violate Hale's law more frequently than average with a relative number around 40%. In contrast, only 4% of medium to large sized active regions violate Hale's law. Furthermore, anti-Hale regions—and small regions in general—tend to have an orientation angle, or tilt, that does not follow Joy's law and have been found to be more prevalent during solar minima.

=== Hale cycle ===
Since Hale's law states that the leading magnetic polarities in each hemisphere alternate between sunspot cycles, it takes two full cycles for the leading polarities to return to their original pattern. This indicates that the approximately 11-year sunspot cycle is one-half of a 22-year magnetic cycle, which is sometimes referred to as a Hale cycle.

== Solar dynamo ==
Hale's law has important implications for the Sun's internal magnetic field and the dynamo that drives it. Namely, the observation that active regions in a given north–south hemisphere all have the same leading magnetic polarity suggests that their emergence is the manifestation of a highly organized east–west-aligned, or toroidal, magnetic field in the Sun's interior. Additionally, the observations that the polarity of the leading magnetic field reverses across the equator and alternates between successive sunspot cycles further suggests that such a toroidal field also reverses polarity across the equator and alternates polarities between cycles.

Hale's law, along with Joy's law for the tilt of sunspot groups and Spörer's law for the variation of active region latitudes, provides strong observational constraints for models of the solar dynamo. For example, according to the Babcock–Leighton mechanism for the solar dynamo, the toroidal field implied by Hale's law is the result of the latitudinal solar differential rotation winding up a north–south-aligned, or poloidal, magnetic field.

== See also ==
- Gnevyshev–Ohl rule
- List of solar cycles
