= RT Virginis =

Star in the constellation Virgo

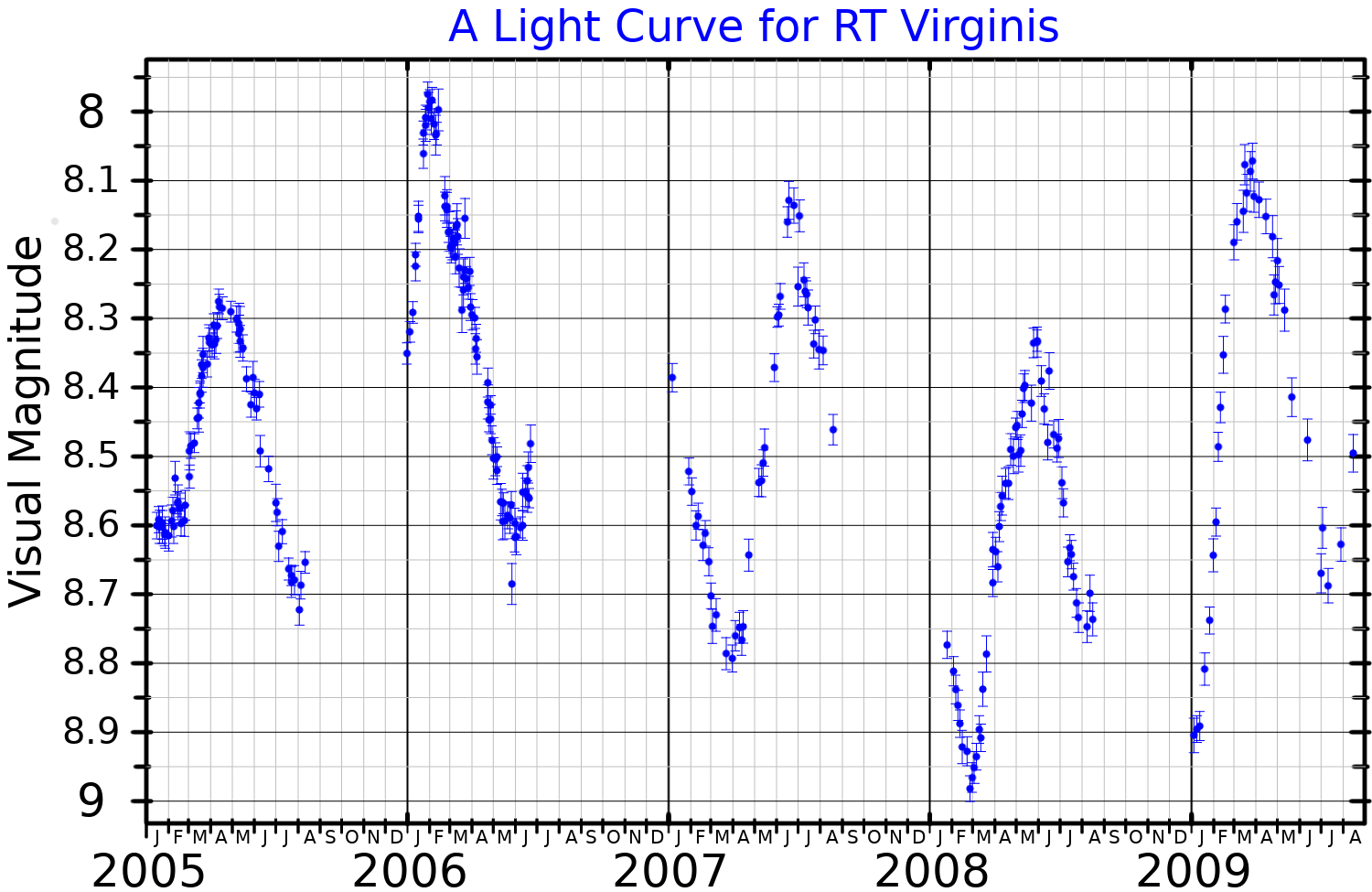
- A visual band light curve for RT Virginis, plotted from ASAS data

Observation data Epoch J2000 Equinox ICRS
- Constellation: Virgo
- Right ascension: 13^{h} 02^{m} 37.981^{s}
- Declination: +05° 11′ 08.36″
- Apparent magnitude (V): 7.7 to 9.7

Characteristics
- Evolutionary stage: AGB
- Spectral type: M8III
- B−V color index: 1.352±0.031
- Variable type: SRb

Astrometry
Radial velocity (R_{v})	17.3±0.2 km/s
Proper motion (μ)	RA: +37.037 mas/yr Dec.: −17.714 mas/yr
Parallax (π)	4.417±0.134 mas
Distance	740 ± 20 ly (226 ± 7 pc)
Absolute magnitude (M_{V})	2.94

Details
Mass	1.5 M_{☉}
Radius	390 R_{☉}
Luminosity (bolometric)	5,012+1,154 −938 L_{☉}
Surface gravity (log g)	+0.21 cgs
Temperature	2,902 K
Metallicity [Fe/H]	−0.33 dex

Other designations
- RT Vir, BD+05°2708, HD 113285, HIP 63642, SAO 119734, PPM 159423

Database references
SIMBAD	data

RT Virginis is a variable star in the equatorial constellation of Virgo, abbreviated RT Vir. It ranges in brightness from an apparent visual magnitude of 7.7 down to 9.7, which is too faint to be visible to the naked eye. Based on parallax measurements made with the VLBI, the distance to this star is approximately 740 light years. It is receding from the Sun with a radial velocity of 17 km/s.

The long period variability of this star was discovered by W. P. Fleming in 1896, based on photographic plates taken between 1886 and 1895. It was listed with its variable star designation, RT Virginis, in Annie Jump Cannon's 1907 work Second Catalog of Variable Stars. A. H. Joy in 1942 categorized it as an irregular variable with a stellar classification of M8III. In 1969 it was classified as a semiregular variable star of the SRb type. The period was determined to be 155 days by P. N. Kholopov and associates in 1985, then re-evaluated as 375 days based on AAVSO light curves in 1997. This is an oxygen-rich red giant star on the asymptotic giant branch of its evolution, and is undergoing mass loss due to thermal pulsation.

Water vapor emission in the vicinity of the star was detected in the microwave band by D. F. Dickinson in 1973. This is originating from strong maser emission in a circumstellar gas-dust shell. The flux density of these water masers is over 100 Jy. The star is losing mass at a rate of 3×10^{−6} M_{☉}·yr^{−1}; the equivalent of the Sun's mass in 3.3 million years. The velocity of the spherically expanding gas is as high as 11 km/s in the water maser region, at a radius of 5 to 25 AU. In a SiO emitting region located ~400 AU from the star, the gas velocity is 7.8 km/s. This outflow appears clumpy and asymmetrical with a strong temporal variation.
