= Mons Hadley =

Mountain on the Moon

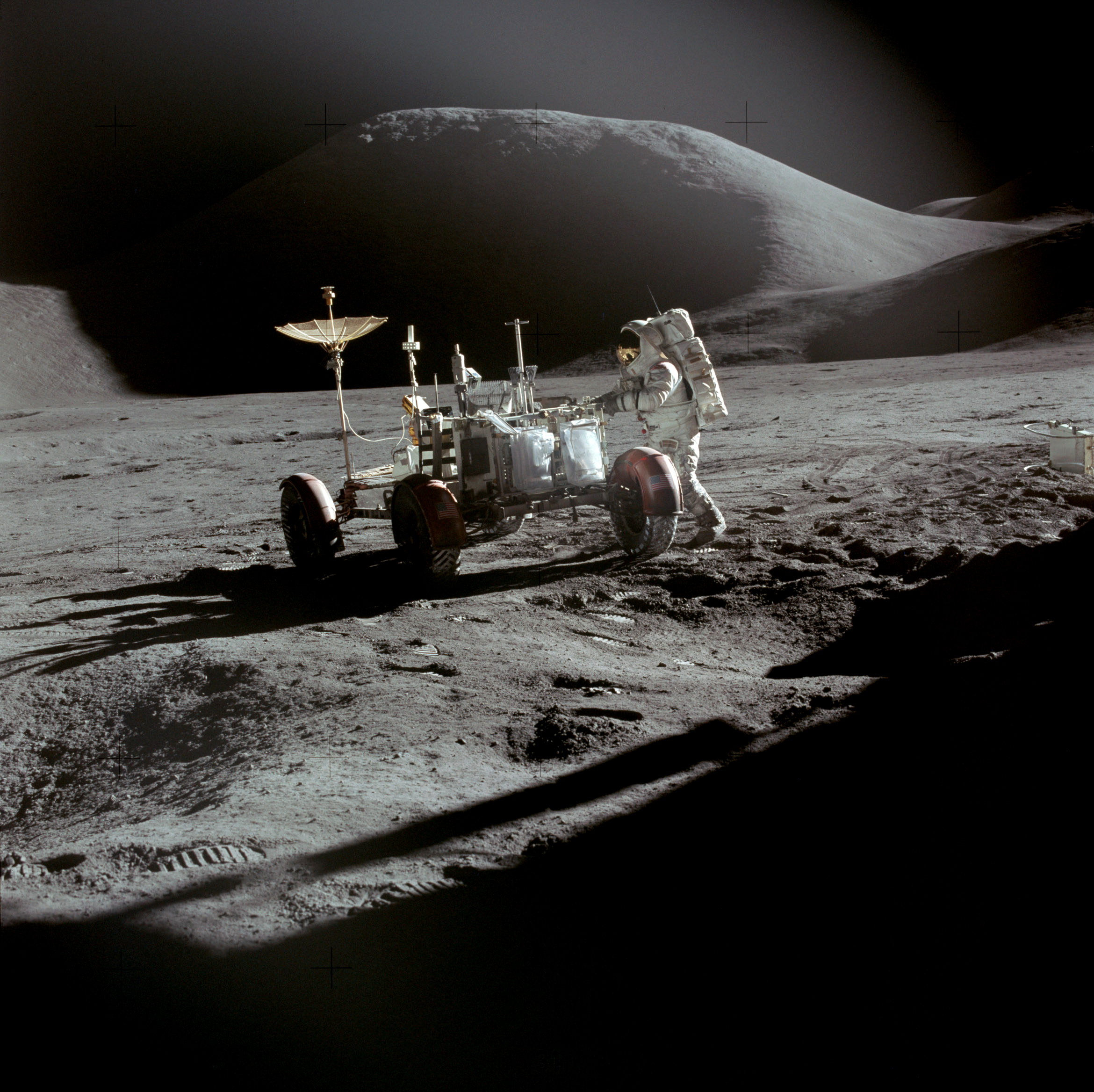
- Jim Irwin and the LRV from Apollo 15, with Mons Hadley in the background

Highest point
- Elevation: 4.5 km (2.8 mi) 14,764 ft (4,500 m)
- Listing: Lunar mountains
- Coordinates: 26.69°N 4.12°E

Geography
- Location: the Moon

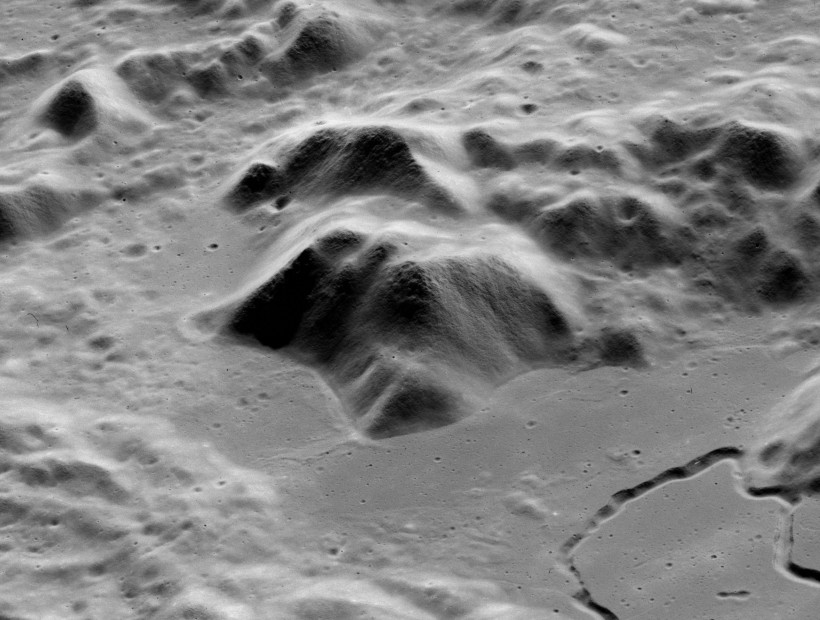
Oblique view of Mons Hadley, including Hadley Rille (lower right), from orbit

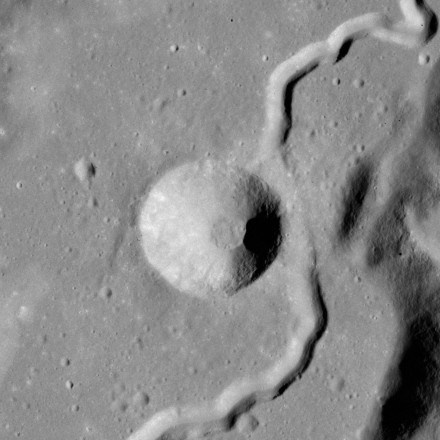
Hadley C crater, with ejecta filling in part of Hadley Rille

Mons Hadley is a massif in the northern portion of the Montes Apenninus, a range in the northern hemisphere of the Moon. It has a height of 4.5 km (2.8 mi) 14,764 ft (4,500 m) above the adjacent plain and a maximum diameter of 25 km at the base.

To the southwest of this mountain is a valley that served as the landing site for the Apollo 15 expedition. To the southwest of this same valley is the slightly smaller Mons Hadley Delta (δ) peak with a height of about 3.5 km above the valley floor. Mons Hadley Delta was visited and sampled by the astronauts, but Mons Hadley itself was only photographed from the surface. To the west of these peaks is the sinuous Rima Hadley rille.

These features were named after the English mathematician John Hadley (1682–1744). Its designation was formally adopted by the International Astronomical Union in 1935. The name was incorporated into lunar nomenclature by German astronomer Johann Schröter in 1791.

== Rima Hadley ==
This sinuous lunar rille follows a course generally to the northeast, toward the Mons Hadley peak, for which it is named. This feature is centered at selenographic coordinates 25.0° N, 3.0° E, and lies within a diameter of 80 km. It begins at the crater Béla, an elongated formation with the long axis oriented to the northwest.

== Nearby craters ==
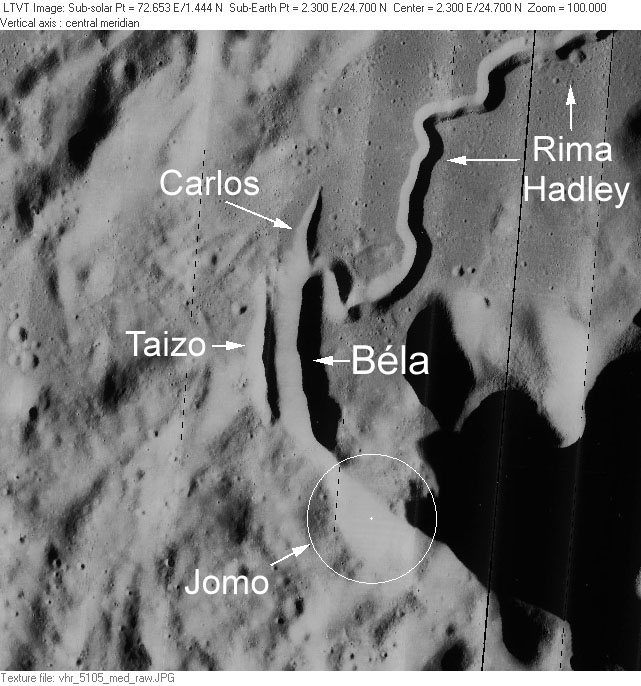
Selenographic features of Rima Hadley and its small craters

Four small craters near this rille have been assigned names by the IAU. These are listed in the table below.

Crater	Coordinates	Diameter	Name source
Béla	24.7°N 2.3°E	11 × 2 km	Hungarian masculine name
Carlos	24.9°N 2.3°E	4 km	Spanish masculine name
Jomo	24.4°N 2.4°E	7 km	African masculine name
Taizo	24.7°N 2.2°E	6 km	Japanese masculine name

== Satellite craters ==
By convention these features are identified on lunar maps by placing the letter on the side of the crater midpoint that is closest to Mons Hadley.

Hadley	Latitude	Longitude	Diameter
C	25.5° N	2.8° E	6 km

The crater Joy was formerly known as Hadley A, prior to being renamed by the IAU in 1973.

== See also ==
- Hadley–Apennine
- List of mountains on the Moon
