= Joy (crater) =

Crater on the Moon

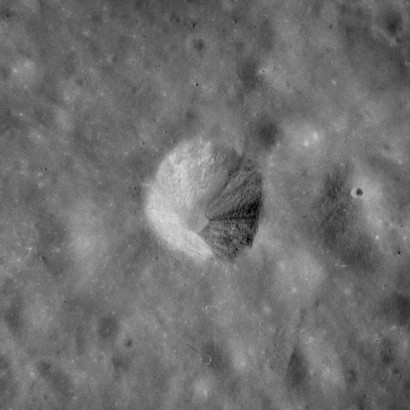
- Apollo 15 mapping camera image
- Coordinates: 25.0°N 6.6°E
- Diameter: 6 km
- Depth: 1.0 km
- Colongitude: 353° at sunrise
- Eponym: Alfred H. Joy

Joy is a small lunar impact crater located in the irregular ground just to the west of Mare Serenitatis. It is a circular, cup-shaped feature with a slightly raised rim.

The crater was named after American astronomer Alfred Harrison Joy in 1973. Before, it was designated Hadley A. Mons Hadley lies to the west-northwest in the Montes Apenninus range.
