= WaLSA Team =

International team studying Sun activity

Waves in the Lower Solar Atmosphere (WaLSA) Team
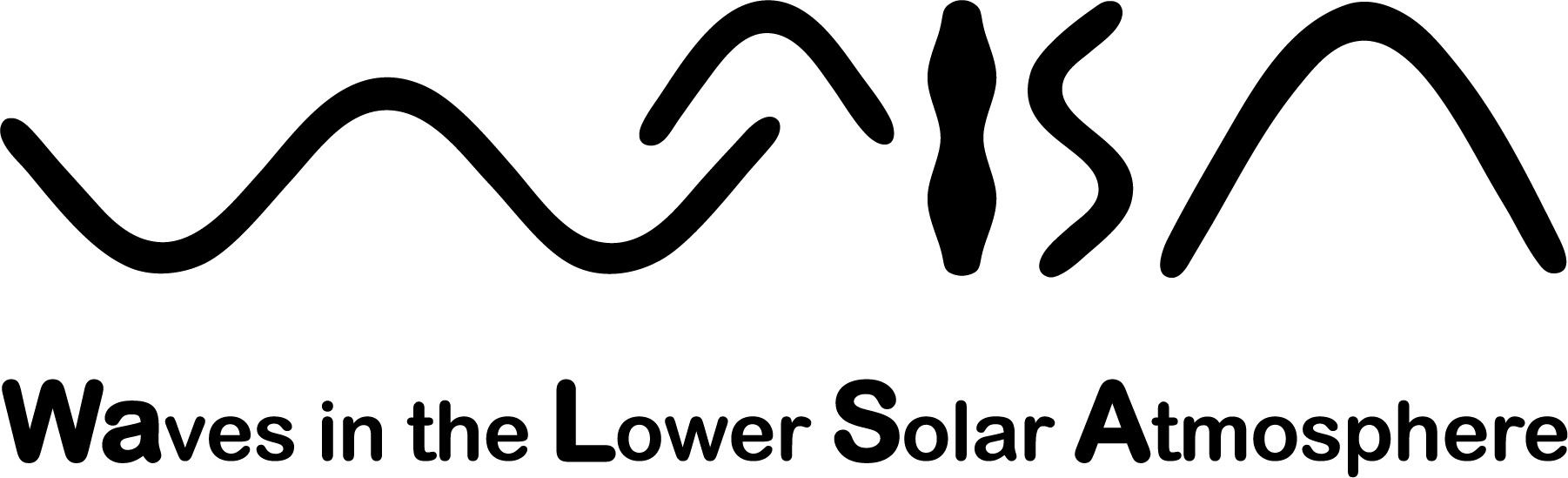
- Formation: 2018
- Fields: Astrophysics
- Members: 41 (February 2024)
- Website: walsa.team

The Waves in the Lower Solar Atmosphere (WaLSA) team is an international consortium that is focused on investigating wave activity in the Sun's lower atmosphere. The purpose of the group is to understand how magnetohydrodynamic (MHD) waves generated within the Sun's interior and lower atmosphere affect the dynamics and heating of its outer layers.

The WaLSA team's research has been supported by organizations including the Research Council of Norway through the Rosseland Centre for Solar Physics, the Royal Society, and the International Space Science Institute.

== Research ==
The WaLSA team's research focuses on understanding various wave modes propagating through solar structures. They have investigated the coupling mechanisms between different wave modes and measured energy carried by MHD waves.
