= Gnevyshev–Ohl rule =

Astronomical rule

Figure 1. Illustration of the GO rule. The blue circles are pairs of cycles, the dashed red lines are linear regressions (the pair 4-5 is excluded from the left regression). The Pearson correlation coefficients are R=0.91 for even-odd pairs (the left panel) and R=0.41 for odd-even ones (the right panel).

The Gnevyshev–Ohl (GO) rule is an empirical rule according to which the sum of Wolf's sunspot numbers in odd cycles with preceding even cycles (E+O) are highly correlated and the correlation is lower if even cycles and preceding odd ones (O+E) are taken (see Figure 1). Sometimes a simplified formulation of the rule is used, according to which the sums over odd cycles exceeds those of the preceding even cycles (see Figure 2). The rule breaks down under certain conditions. In particular, it inverts sign across the Dalton minimum, but can be restored with the "lost cycle" in the end of the 18th century. The nature of the GO rule is still unclear.

The rule is named after soviet astronomers Mstislav N. Gnevyshev and A. I. Ohl, who published on the topic in 1948 and in various book volumes on heliobiology.

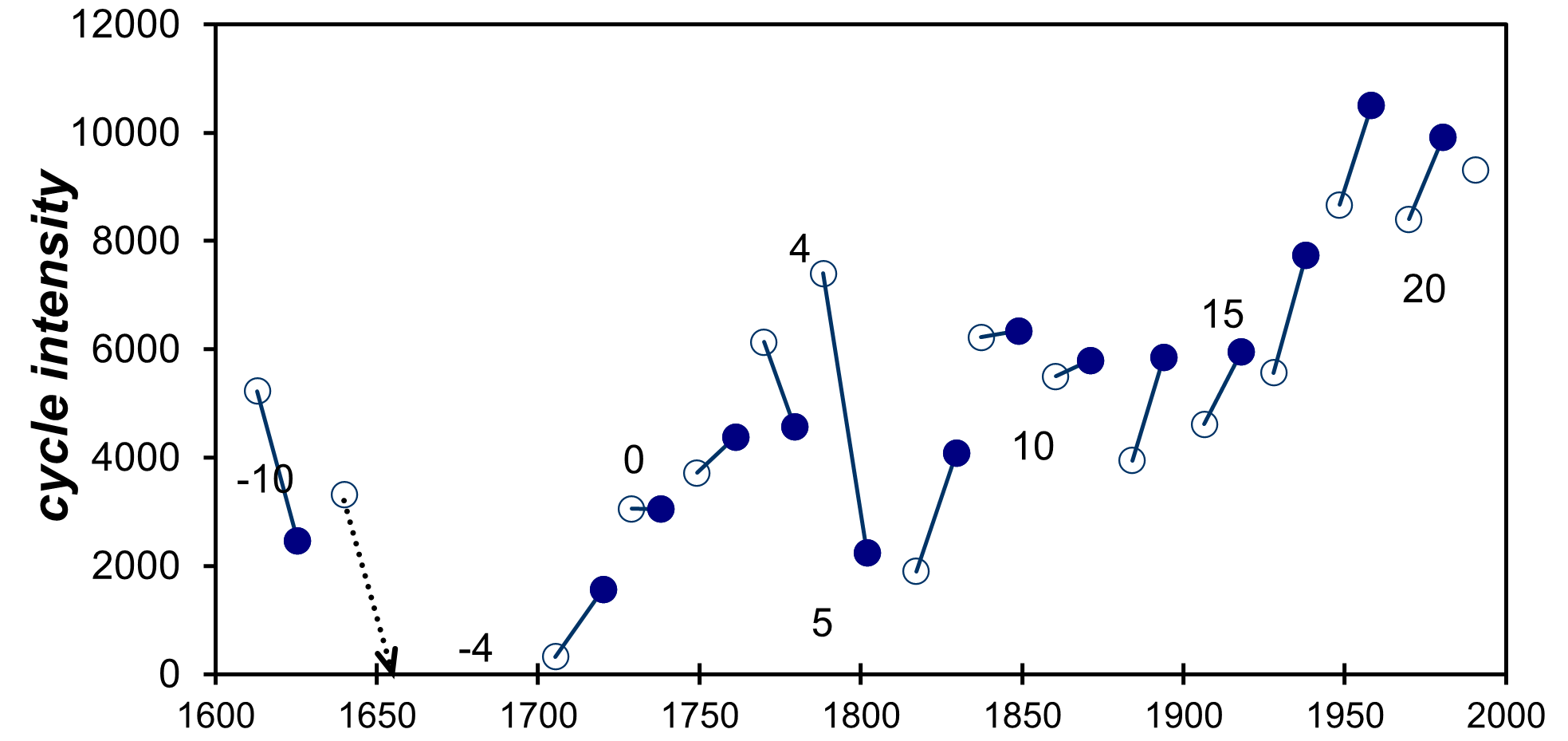
Figure 2. Illustration of the simplified GO rule: Intensities of sunspot cycles in pairs of even (open circles) and odd (filled circles) numbered cycles. The GO rule is expressed in the connecting lines pointing up. The break of the rule for cycles 2–3 and 4–5 is visible.
