= Horace W. Babcock =

American astronomer (1912–2003)

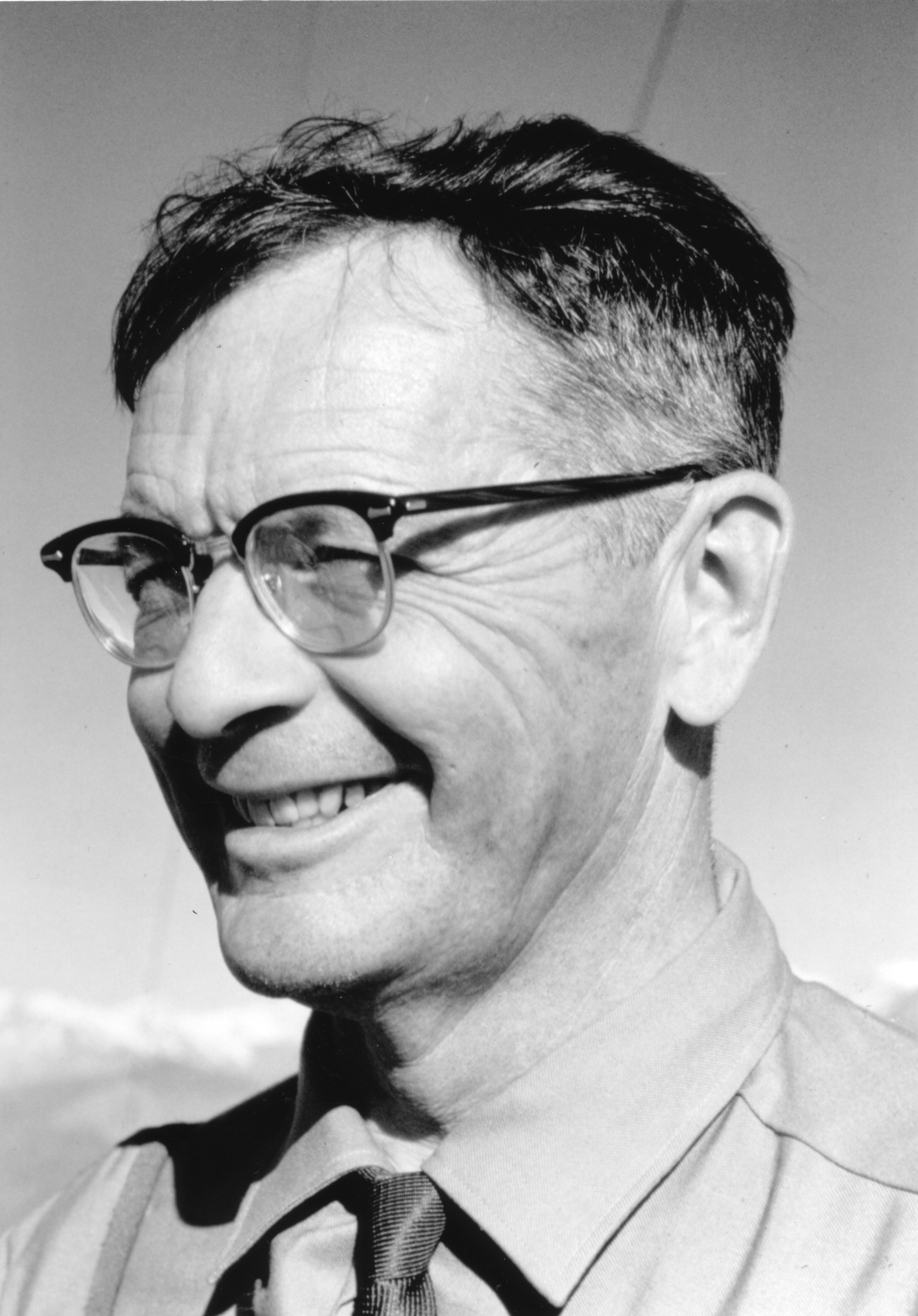
- Babcock in 1976
- Born: September 13, 1912
- Died: August 29, 2003 (aged 90)
- Known for: Adaptive Optics; Babcock Model
- Awards: Henry Draper Medal (1957); Eddington Medal (1958); Bruce Medal (1969); Gold Medal of the Royal Astronomical Society (1970); George Ellery Hale Prize (1992)
- Scientific career
- Fields: astronomy

Horace Welcome Babcock (September 13, 1912 – August 29, 2003) was an American astronomer. He was the son of Harold D. Babcock.

== Career ==
Babcock invented and built several astronomical instruments and was the first to propose adaptive optics in 1953. He specialized in spectroscopy and the study of magnetic fields of stars. He proposed the Babcock Model, a theory for the magnetism of sunspots.

During World War II, he was engaged in radiation work at MIT and Caltech. After the war, he began a productive collaboration with his father. His undergraduate studies were at Caltech, and his doctorate was from the University of California, Berkeley.

Babcock's 1938 doctoral thesis contained one of the earliest discoveries of dark matter. He reported measurements of the rotation curve for the Andromeda galaxy (M31) and wrote, "The velocities therefore indicate a greater mass than that derived from the luminosity. This discrepancy can hardly be explained unless we postulate either a change in the nature of the stellar population in the outer parts of the nebula or a departure from the laws of circular motion," and "the mass-to-light ratio increases markedly at large radii. It is evident that the outer parts of the nebula contain either a great amount of non-luminous matter or that the motions depart significantly from circularity." Babcock considered the possibility that there was more dust in the outer parts of the galaxy than previously thought, thereby increasing the mass-to-light ratio, but did not conclude this was the explanation. Nonetheless, it was not until the work of Morton (Mort) Roberts in the late 1960s, Rubin & Ford, and Freeman in regard to NGC 300, that attention to spiral galaxy rotation curves was again in the spotlight as an indication of a mass or gravity problem in spiral galaxies.

Babcock was director of the Palomar Observatory for Caltech from 1964 to 1978.

== Honors ==
Awards

- Henry Draper Medal of the National Academy of Sciences (1957)
- Eddington Medal (1958)
- Fellow of the American Academy of Arts and Sciences (1959)
- Bruce Medal (1969)
- Gold Medal of the Royal Astronomical Society (1970)
- George Ellery Hale Prize of the American Astronomical Society Solar Physics Division (1992)

Named after him

- Asteroid 3167 Babcock (jointly with his father)
- Babcock crater on the Moon is named only for his father

Honors

- Elected to the United States National Academy of Sciences (1954)
- Elected to the American Academy of Arts and Sciences (1959)
- Elected to the American Philosophical Society (1966)
