= Alfred Harrison Joy =

American astronomer (1882–1973)

Alfred Harrison Joy (September 23, 1882 in Greenville, Illinois – April 18, 1973 in Pasadena, California) was an astronomer best known for his work on stellar distances, the radial motion of stars, and variable stars. Joy's law in solar physics is named after him.

== Early years ==
He was born in Greenville, Illinois, the son of F.P. Joy, a prominent clothing merchant in Greenville and one-time mayor of the town. He received a BA from Greenville College in 1903 and an MA from Oberlin College the next year.

== Career ==
After graduating, Joy went on to work at the American University of Beirut in the Syrian Protestant College as a professor of astronomy and the director of the observatory. He was forced to return to the U.S. in 1915 because of World War I.

In the United States, he worked at the Mount Wilson Observatory from 1915 to 1952. There, he and his colleagues ascertained the spectral type, absolute magnitude, and stellar distance of over 5,000 stars. Joy also initially defined the T-Tauri type star. He studied the Doppler displacement of the spectral lines of stars to determine their radial velocities deducing a star's absolute dimensions, masses, and the orbital elements of some specific stars. He won the Bruce Medal in 1950.

He was president of the Astronomical Society of the Pacific in 1931 and 1939.

== Honors ==
A crater on the Moon has been named in his honor.
