= Babcock model =

Mechanism explaining sunspot patterns

Butterfly diagram showing paired sunspot pattern. Graph is sunspot Wolf number.

In solar physics, the Babcock model and its variants describe a mechanism with which they attempt to explain magnetic and sunspot patterns observed on the Sun. It is named after Horace W. Babcock.

== History ==
The modern understanding of sunspots starts with George Ellery Hale, who linked magnetic fields and sunspots. Hale suggested that the sunspot cycle period is 22 years, covering two polar reversals of the solar magnetic dipole field.

Horace W. Babcock proposed in 1961 a qualitative model for solar dynamics. On the largest scale, the Sun supports an oscillatory magnetic field, with a quasi-steady periodicity of 22 years. This oscillation is known as the Babcock-Leighton dynamo cycle, proposed by Robert B. Leighton, amounting to the oscillatory exchange of energy between poloidal and toroidal solar magnetic field ingredients.

== Babcock-Leighton dynamo cycle ==
A half-dynamo-cycle corresponds to a single sunspot solar cycle. At a solar maximum, the external poloidal dipolar magnetic field is near its dynamo-cycle minimum strength, but an internal toroidal quadrupolar field, generated through differential rotation, is near its maximum strength. At this point in the dynamo cycle, buoyant upwelling within the convective zone forces the emergence of a toroidal magnetic field through the photosphere, giving rise to patches of concentrated magnetic field corresponding to sunspots.

During the solar cycle’s declining phase, energy shifts from the internal toroidal magnetic field to the external poloidal field, and sunspots diminish in number. At a solar-cycle minimum, the toroidal field is, correspondingly, at minimum strength, sunspots are few in number, and the poloidal field is at its maximum strength. With the rise of the next 11-year sunspot cycle, magnetic energy shifts back from the poloidal to the toroidal field, but with a polarity that is opposite to the previous cycle. The process carries on continuously, and in an idealized, simplified scenario, each 11-year sunspot cycle corresponds to a change in the overall polarity of the Sun's large-scale magnetic field.
