= Joy's law (astronomy) =

Empirical law for solar active regions

Sunspot group in the Sun's northern hemisphere with tilt angle $\theta$

In solar physics, Joy's law is an empirical law for the distribution of sunspots in active regions. It states that the magnitude at which the sunspots are "tilted"—with the leading spot(s) closer to the heliographic equator than the trailing spot(s)―grows with the latitude of these regions. Joy's law provides observational support for the operation of the "alpha effect" in solar dynamo action. It is named after American astronomer Alfred Harrison Joy.

== See also ==
- Spörer's law
