= Spörer's law =

Empirical law for solar active regions

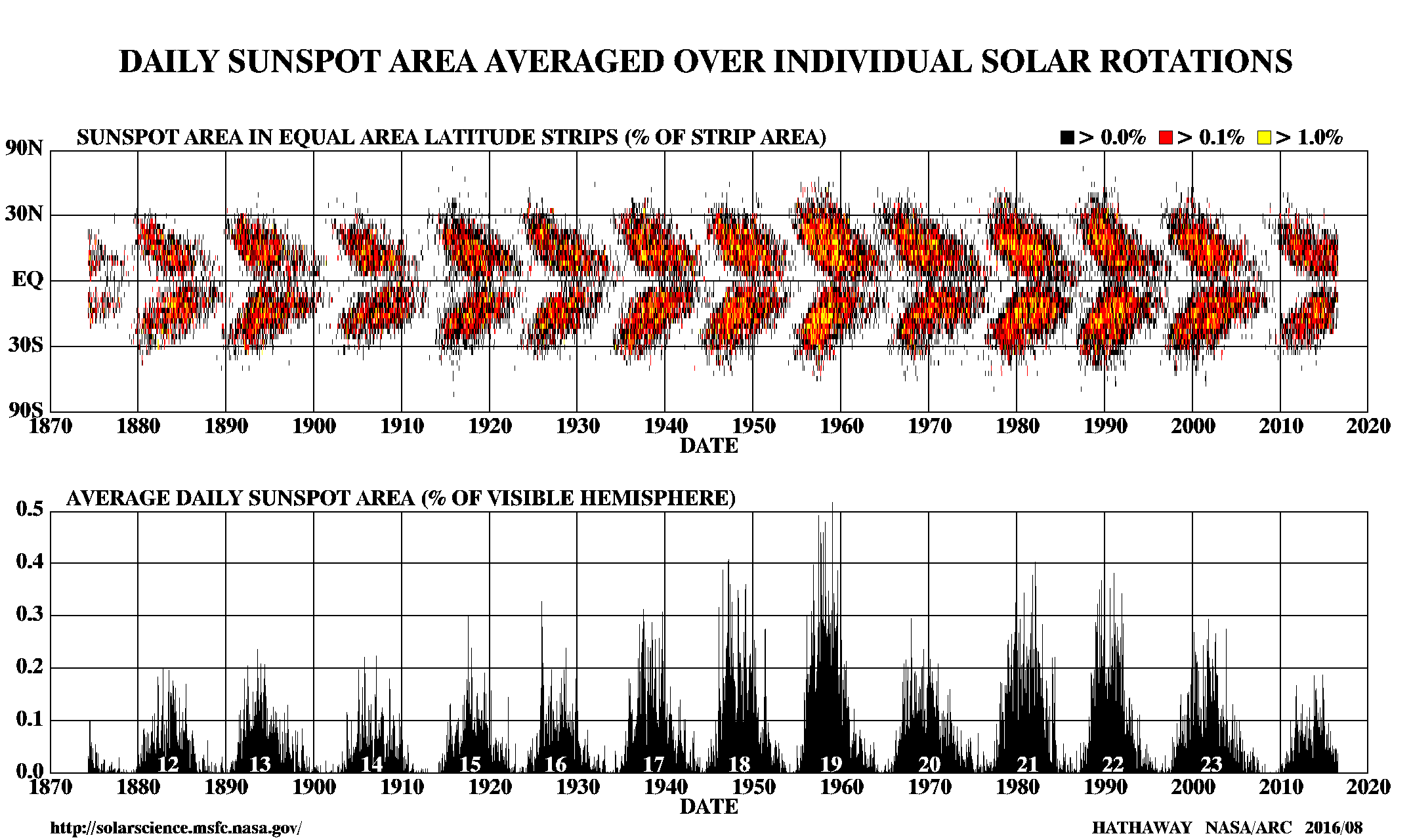

In solar physics, Spörer's law is an empirical law for the variation of heliographic latitudes at which solar active regions form during a solar cycle. It was discovered by the English astronomer Richard Christopher Carrington around 1861. Carrington's work was refined by the German astronomer Gustav Spörer.

At the start of a solar cycle, active regions tend to appear around 30° to 45° latitude on the Sun's surface. As the cycle progresses, they appear at lower and lower latitudes, until they average 15° at solar maximum. The average latitude then continues to drift lower, down to about 7° and then while the old sunspot cycle fades, active regions of the new cycle start appearing at high latitudes.

== See also ==
- Solar variation
- Wolf number
- Joy's law (astronomy)
