= Segner =

Segner may refer to:

- 28878 Segner (2000 KL41), a Main-belt Asteroid discovered in 2000
- Johann Andreas Segner (1704–1777), Carpatho-German mathematician, physicist, and physician
- Segner (crater), a lunar crater
- Segner wheel, type of water turbine invented by Ján Andrej Segner in the 18th century
