= Rost (crater) =

Lunar surface depression

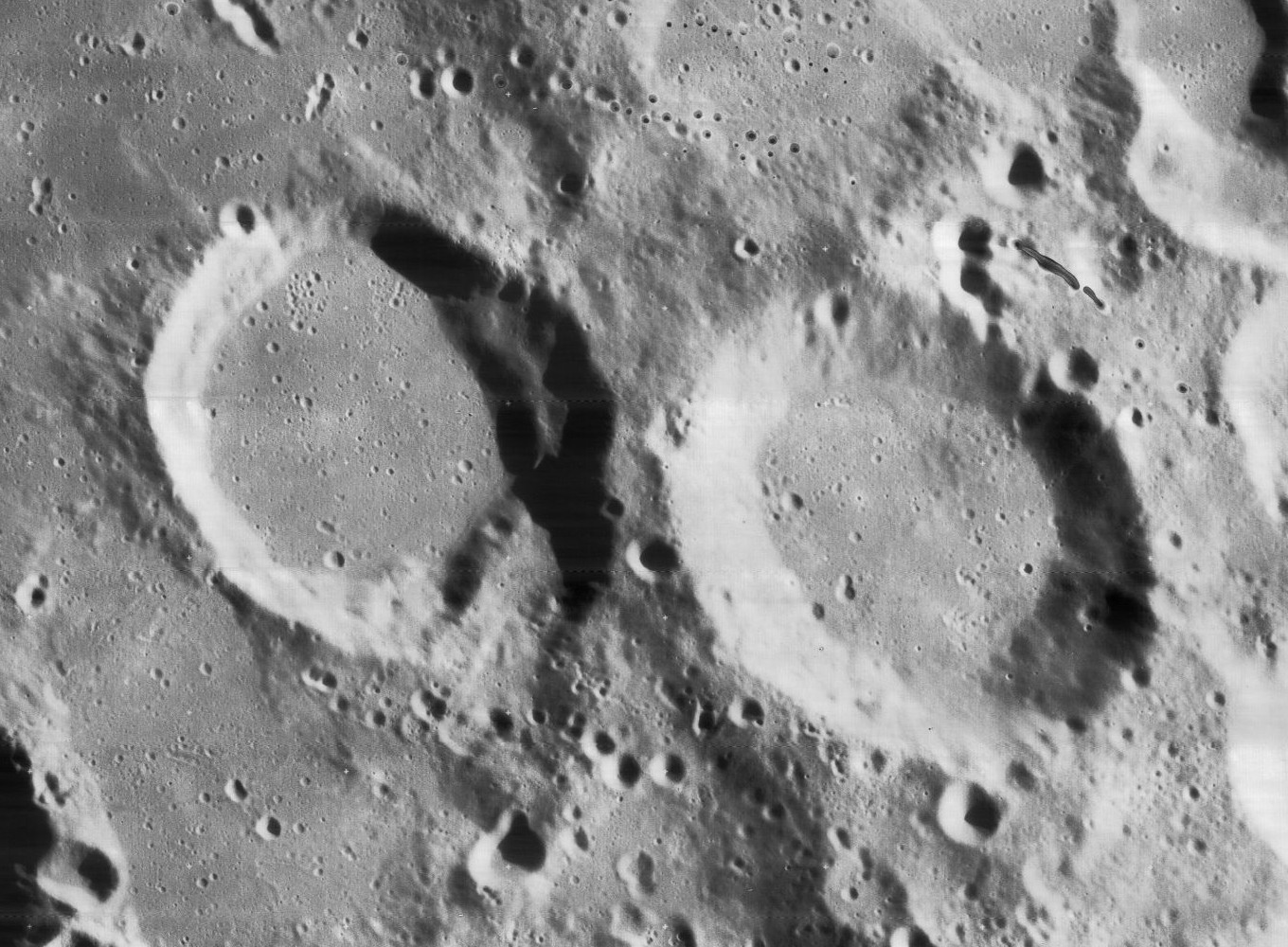
- Lunar Orbiter 4 image of Rost (right) and Rost A (left)
- Coordinates: 56.4°S 33.7°W
- Diameter: 48 km
- Depth: 2.0 km
- Colongitude: 35° at sunrise
- Eponym: J. Leonhard Rost

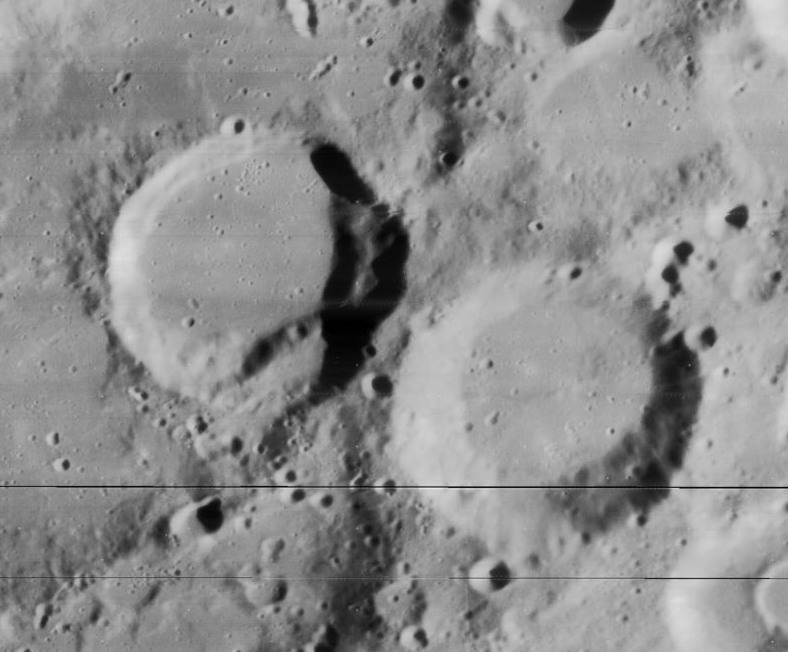
Another view from Lunar Orbiter 4 (black lines are artifact of image reprocessing)

Rost is a lunar impact crater that is located in the southwestern part of the Moon, to the southeast of the elongated formation Schiller. To the southeast of Rost is the larger crater Scheiner. West-southwest of this formation is the smaller Weigel.

This crater is a circular formation with a low rim and a relatively featureless inner wall and interior floor. There are some tiny craterlets around the rim, including one across the northwest wall and another on the inner wall to the south. The interior has no significant features, with only a tiny craterlet to mark the surface.

Rost lies east of the Schiller-Zucchius Basin, and the outer rim of the basin lies between Rost and Rost A.

== Satellite craters ==
By convention these features are identified on lunar maps by placing the letter on the side of the crater midpoint that is closest to Rost.

Rost	Latitude	Longitude	Diameter
A	56.5° S	36.7° W	45 km
B	54.6° S	36.0° W	20 km
D	56.6° S	30.9° W	31 km
M	55.5° S	31.4° W	27 km
N	57.2° S	33.0° W	6 km
