= Weigel (crater) =

Lunar surface depression

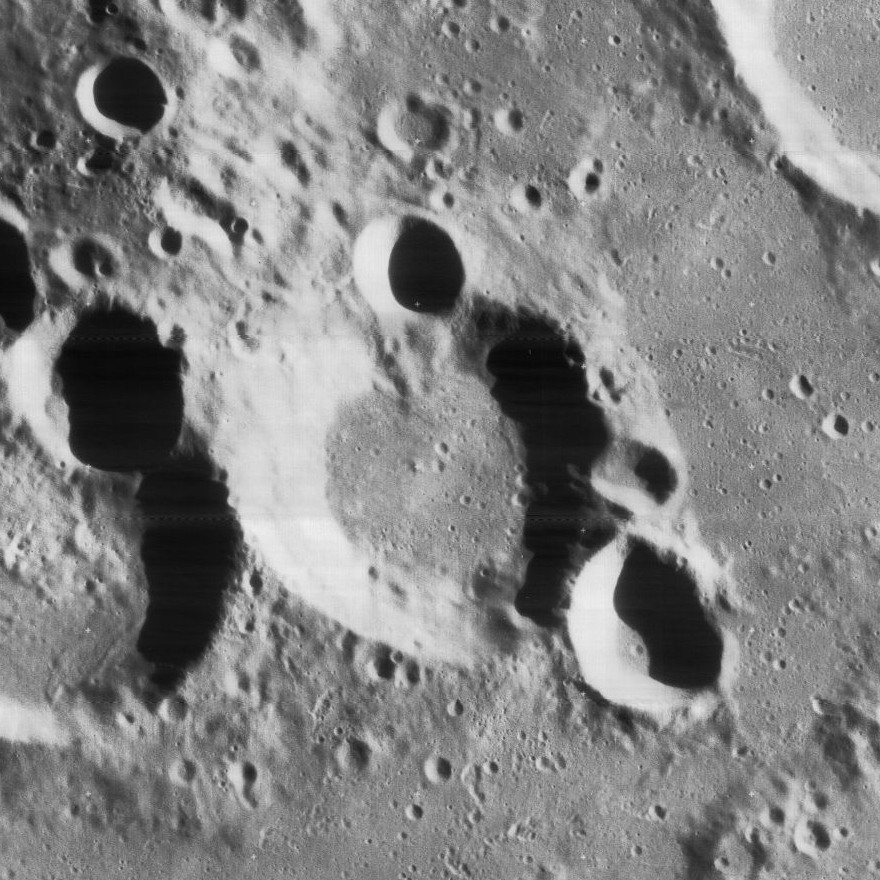
- Lunar Orbiter 4 image
- Coordinates: 58.2°S 38.8°W
- Diameter: 69 km
- Depth: 4.2 km
- Colongitude: 420° at sunrise
- Eponym: Erhard Weigel

Weigel is a small lunar impact crater that is located in the southwestern part of the Moon. It lies to the west-southwest of the slightly larger crater Rost, and due south of the elongated Schiller. To the west is Segner.

The rim of this crater is slightly eroded, with a small crater across the northern edge and the satellite crater Weigel A and another smaller craterlet intruding slightly into the eastern face. The crater Weigel B, actually slightly larger than Weigel, is attached to the southwestern exterior. This satellite crater is overlain by multiple impacts along its northern and western rim.

The inner walls of Weigel have only some minor irregularities, and generally slope straight down to the bottom. The interior floor is a level, nearly featureless plain.

Weigel lies within the southeast portion of the Schiller-Zucchius Basin.

== Satellite craters ==
By convention these features are identified on lunar maps by placing the letter on the side of the crater midpoint that is closest to Weigel.

Weigel	Latitude	Longitude	Diameter
A	58.6° S	37.8° W	17 km
B	58.8° S	41.1° W	37 km
C	59.5° S	41.9° W	10 km
D	58.0° S	41.6° W	16 km
E	56.9° S	42.3° W	11 km
F	57.5° S	40.9° W	7 km
G	57.7° S	35.3° W	7 km
H	58.2° S	40.6° W	15 km
