= Nöggerath (crater) =

Crater on the Moon

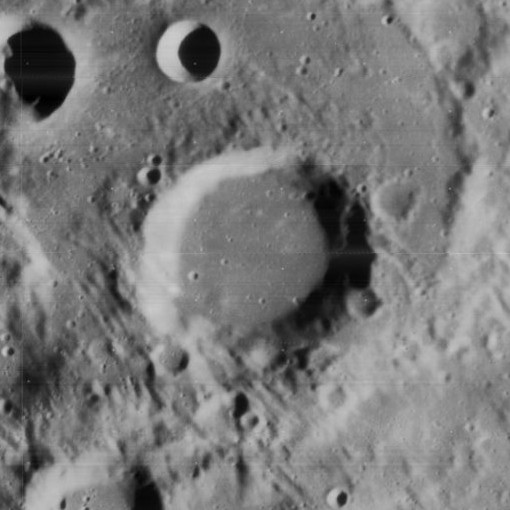
- Lunar Orbiter 4 image (black lines are artifact of image reprocessing)
- Coordinates: 48.8°S 45.7°W
- Diameter: 31 km
- Depth: 1.5 km
- Colongitude: 46° at sunrise
- Eponym: Johann J. Nöggerath

Nöggerath is a relatively small lunar impact crater in the southwest section of the Moon. It is located to the northwest of Phocylides, and is pointed toward by the northern elongation of Schiller. Nöggerath is a relatively unremarkable crater, with a smooth floor and a rim that is only slightly eroded and impacted at the southern edge.

Nöggerath lies north of the Schiller-Zucchius Basin.

== Satellite craters ==
By convention these features are identified on lunar maps by placing the letter on the side of the crater midpoint that is closest to Nöggerath.

Nöggerath	Latitude	Longitude	Diameter
A	47.9° S	43.4° W	7 km
B	47.0° S	43.4° W	5 km
C	45.8° S	43.1° W	13 km
D	47.2° S	41.5° W	14 km
E	45.2° S	43.9° W	5 km
F	48.0° S	46.9° W	9 km
G	50.3° S	45.8° W	21 km
H	49.6° S	47.9° W	26 km
J	48.4° S	47.9° W	17 km
K	44.9° S	46.3° W	4 km
L	45.2° S	47.2° W	5 km
M	44.0° S	46.6° W	11 km
P	47.7° S	41.8° W	10 km
S	44.5° S	46.2° W	6 km
