= Bettinus (crater) =

Lunar surface depression

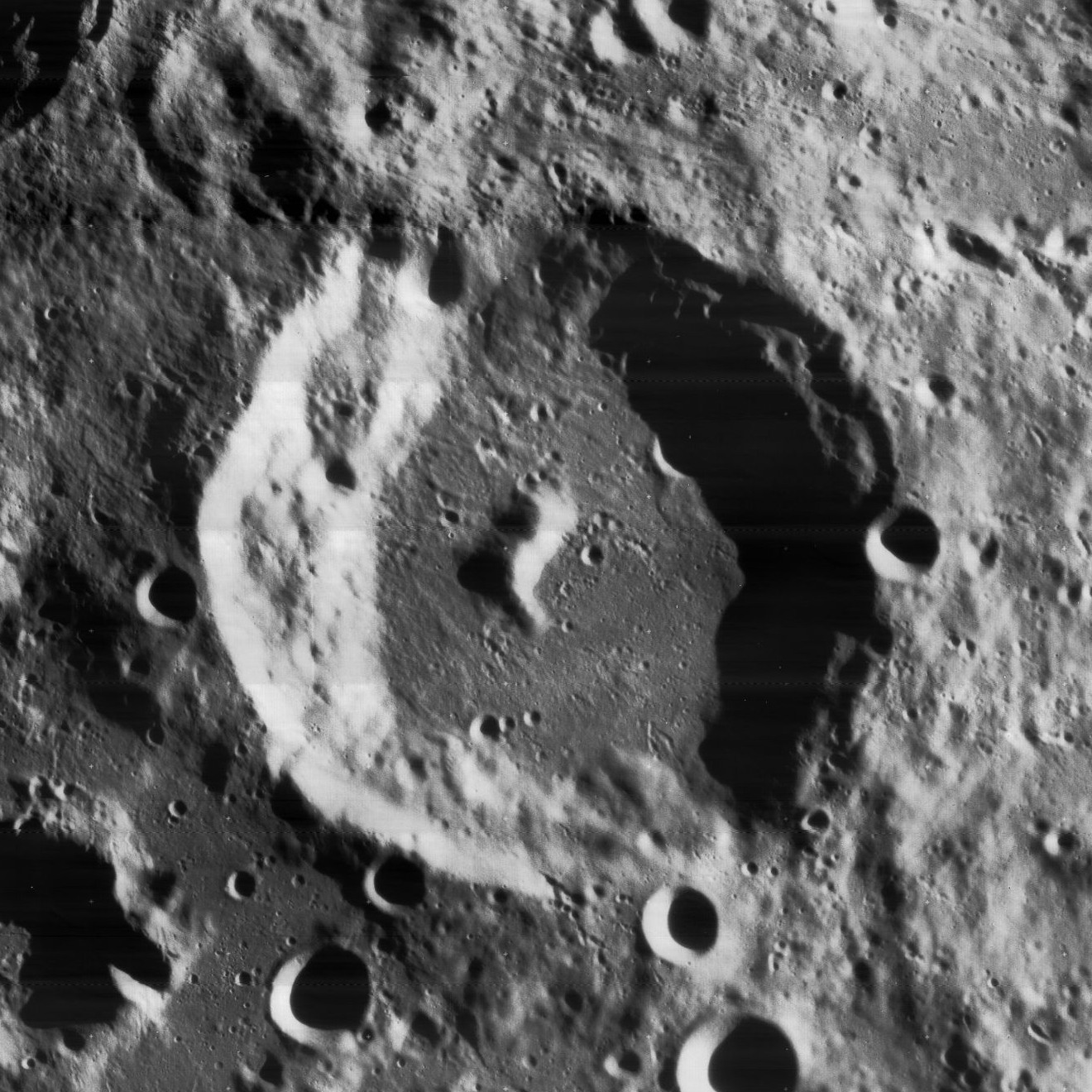
- Coordinates: 63.40°S 45.16°W
- Diameter: 71.78 km (44.60 mi)
- Depth: 3.8 km (2.4 mi)
- Colongitude: 45° at sunrise
- Eponym: Mario Bettinus

Bettinus is a lunar impact crater located near the southwest limb. Due to its location, the crater has a distinctly oval shape because of foreshortening. To the south of the rim is the similar-sized crater Kircher, and to the northwest is the slightly smaller Zucchius. From the west to the southwest, closer to the limb, is the giant formation Bailly. Bettinus lies due south of the Schiller-Zucchius Basin.

The rim of Bettinus is somewhat worn, with a terraced inner wall that is wider to the northwest. The interior floor is relatively flat, with a central rise that is offset to the west of the midpoint. The spectra of the central peak fits a noritic anorthosite mineralogy, which originated from a depth of 7.1 to 11.1 km. There is a small crater along the eastern rim.

This crater is named after the Italian mathematician and astronomer Mario Bettinus (1582-1657). The name was incorporated into lunar nomenclature by Italian astronomer Giovanni Riccioli in 1651, who labelled it "Bettinus Soc. I". Its modern designation was formally adopted by the International Astronomical Union in 1935.

== Satellite craters ==
By convention these features are identified on lunar maps by placing the letter on the side of the crater midpoint that is closest to Bettinus.

Bettinus	Coordinates	Diameter
A	64.88°S 49.03°W	26 km
B	63.54°S 51.31°W	25 km
C	63.33°S 38.09°W	23 km
D	65.00°S 46.61°W	10 km
E	63.21°S 42.38°W	8 km
F	62.97°S 44.02°W	7 km
G	61.60°S 44.74°W	6 km
H	64.62°S 43.82°W	8 km

Both Bettinus B and H contain permanently shadowed regions where sunlight never reaches.
