= Erhard Weigel =

German mathematician, astronomer and philosopher (1625–1699)

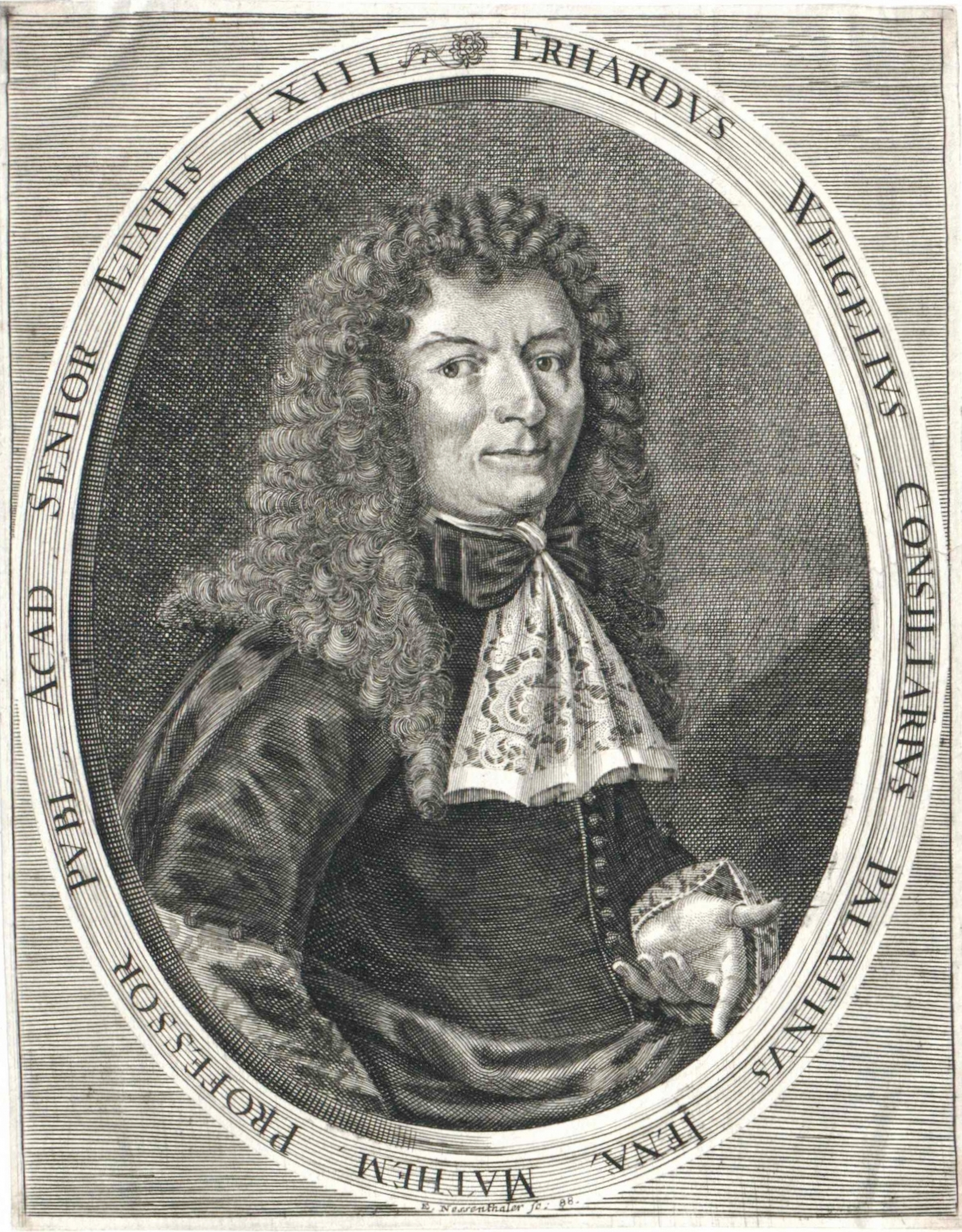
- Erhard Weigel by Elias Nessenthaler
- Born: 16 December 1625; Weiden in der Oberpfalz, Electorate of Bavaria
- Died: 20 March 1699 (aged 73); Jena, Saxe-Weimar
- Education: University of Leipzig (M.A., 1650; Dr. phil. hab. 1652)
- Scientific career
- Fields: Mathematician, astronomer, philosopher
- Workplaces: University of Jena
- Theses: De ascensionibus et descensionibus astronomicis dissertatio (Astronomical dissertation on risings and settings) (1650); Dissertatio Metaphysica Prior (De Existentia); Dissertatio Metaphysica Posterior (De Modo Existentiae, qui dicitur Duratio) (1652)
- Academic advisors: Philipp Müller (1650 thesis advisor)
- Notable students: G. W. Leibniz; Samuel von Pufendorf

Erhard Weigel (German: [ˈeːʁhaʁt ˈvaɪɡl̩]; 16 December 1625 – 20 March 1699) was a German mathematician, astronomer and philosopher.

== Biography ==
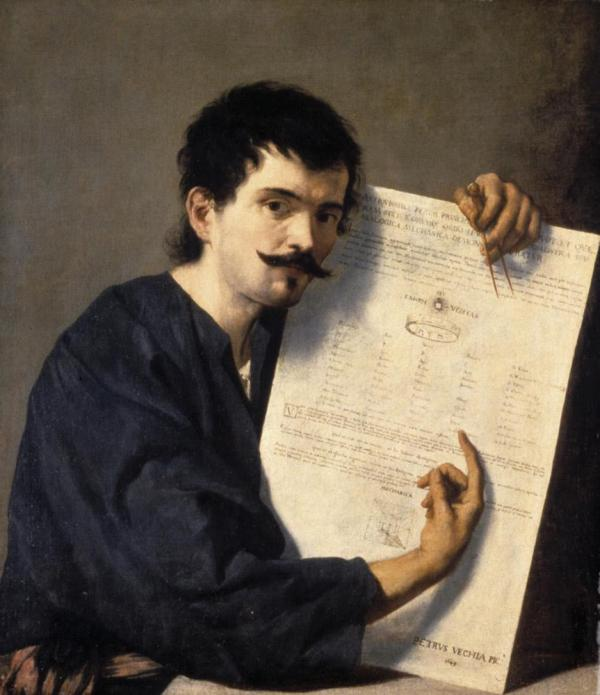
Board with doctrines of Weigel's on a painting by Pietro della Vecchia (1649); formerly wrongly interpreted as a portrait showing Weigel himself.

Weigel earned his M.A. (1650) and his habilitation (1652) from the University of Leipzig. From 1653 until his death he was professor of mathematics at Jena University. He was the teacher of Leibniz in summer 1663, and other notable students. He also worked to make science more widely accessible to the public, and was what would today be considered a populariser of science.

He concurred with Jakob Ellrod's "Mittel-Calendar", and with the advocacy of Leibniz and others, that the date of Easter should be based on the astronomical measurement of the spring equinox and the next full moon. He followed Jakob Ellrod to the Imperial Diet in Regensburg to advocate the use of the Mittel-Calendar or New Gregorian calendar.

=== Timeline ===
- 1625 born in Weiden in der Oberpfalz, son of clothier Michael Weigel and Anna Weigel
- 1627–28 seizures of the Upper Palatinate through imperial troops starting with recatholicization; escape of the Weigel family from Wunsiedel to Ansbach-Bayreuth
- 1638–44 teen years at grammar school in Wunsiedel
- 1644–46 Lutheran high school in Halle (Saale) and simultaneous activity with the astronomer Bartholomäus Schimpfer, who teaches him mathematics
- 1646 temporary return to Wunsiedel; mathematics and astronomy instruction with archdeacon Jakob Ellrod
- 1647–50 studies at the University of Leipzig
- 1650 MA in philosophy: De ascensionibus et descensionibus astronomicis dissertatio (Astronomical dissertation on risings and settings)
- 1652 habilitation in Leipzig with Dissertatio Metaphysica Prior (De Existentia); Dissertatio Metaphysica Posterior (De Modo Existentiae, qui dicitur Duratio)
- 1653 post as mathematics professor at the University of Jena
- 1653 (16 July) begins lectures De Cometa Novo (regarding the comet of December 1652)
- 1653 (12 September) marries Elisabeth Hartmann (a widow)
- 1654 appointment as Stipendiarorum et Alumnorum Inspector (supervision over the Collegium Jenense)
- 1658 publishes the analysis Aristotelica ex Euclide restituta, genuinum sciendi modum, & nativam restauratae Philosophiae faciem per omnes disciplinas & facultates ichnographicè depingens; the work brings him into conflict with the philosophical faculty
- 1660 publishes Theodixis Pythagorica (revised edition 1675)
- 1661 publishes Himmelsspiegels (Speculum Uranicum / Aquilae Romanae Sacrum...)
- 1663 Gottfried Wilhelm Leibniz, studies one semester in Jena, among others under Erhard Weigel
- 1664 publishes of the Speculum Temporis Civilis, containing explanation of the calendar
- 1665 publishes Speculum Terrae
- 1667–70 Weigel's house, in Jena, for its time has remarkable technical interior facilities—among others an elevator and a water pipe
- 1669 publishes Idea Matheseos Universae cum Speciminibus Inventionum Mathematicarum
- 1673 publishes Universi Corporis Pansophici Caput Summum
- 1673 publishes Tetractys, Sumum eum Arithmeticae eum Philosophiae discursivae Compendium
- 1674 publishes an arithmetic description of morals Arithmetische Beschreibung der Moral-Weissheit von Personen und Sachen worauf das gemeine Wesen bestehet
- 1679 Weigel's work on "the mystery of Holy Trinity demonstrated from the principle of geometry", brings him in conflict with the theological faculty and he is forced to retract his work
- 1683 wife Elisabeth dies
- 1688 appointed imperial advisor
- 1691 goes to England to describe research results to the Royal Society, but only reaches the coast where the weather prevents crossing the British Channel
- 1691 calls on the Dutch naturalist Christiaan Huygens at his estate
- 1693 publishes Philosophia Mathematica, Theologia Naturalis Solida
- 1695 becomes chancellor of the University of Jena
- 1699 dies in Jena

(Source:)

== Legacy ==
Through Leibniz, Weigel is the intellectual forefather of a long tradition of mathematicians and mathematical physicists that connects a great number of professionals to this day (see Academic genealogy of theoretical physicists: Erhard Weigel). The Mathematics Genealogy Project lists more than 50,000 "descendants" of Weigel's, including Lagrange, Euler, Poisson and several Fields Medalists.

The crater Weigel on the Moon is named after him. In 1999 a colloquium was held in Jena on the 300th anniversary of his death.
