= Samuel von Pufendorf =

German jurist and philosopher (1632–1694)

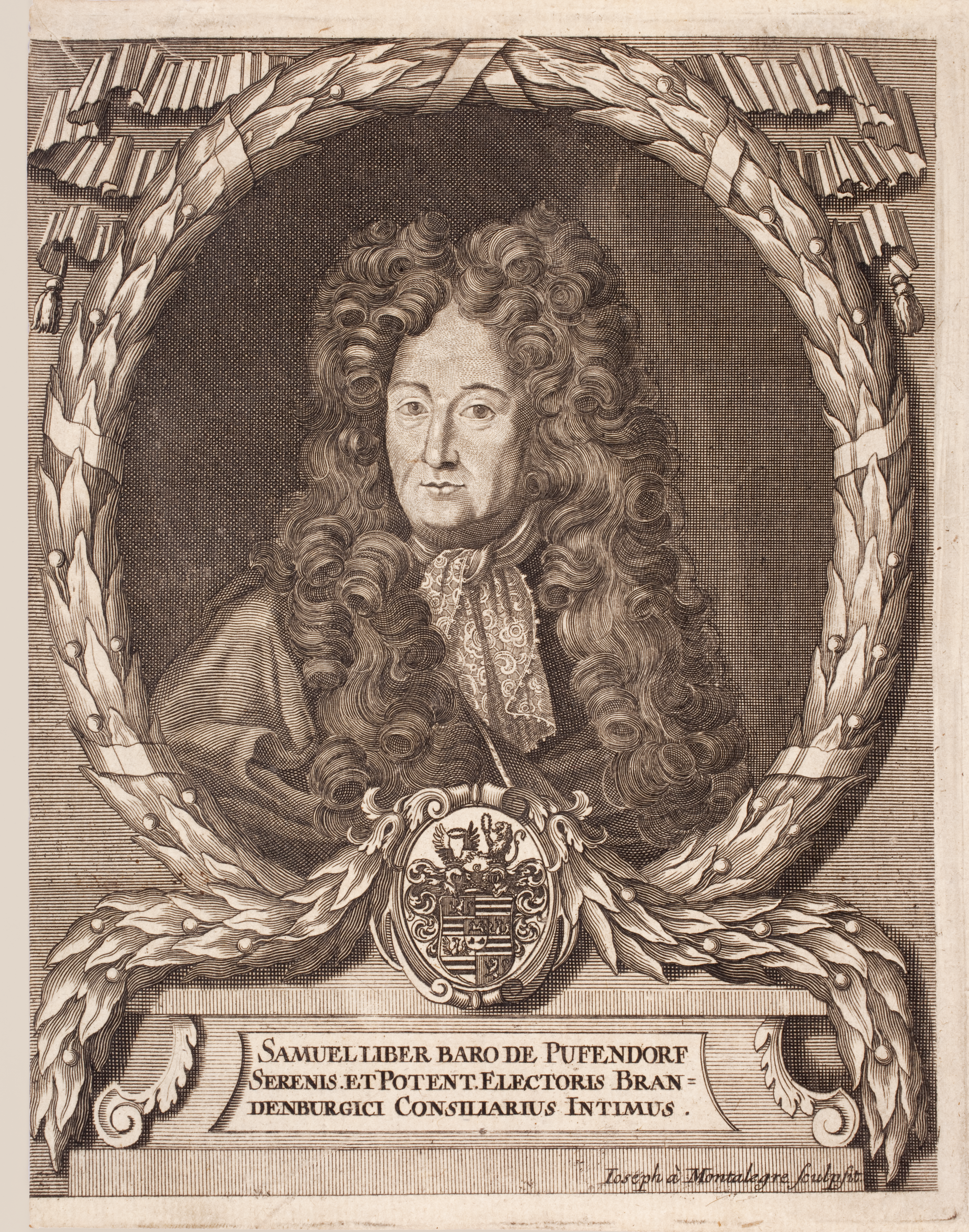
- 1706 engraving
- Born: Samuel Pufendorf; 8 January 1632; Dorfchemnitz, Electorate of Saxony, Holy Roman Empire
- Died: 26 October 1694 (aged 62); Berlin, Margraviate of Brandenburg, Holy Roman Empire

Education
- Education: University of Leipzig; University of Jena
- Academic advisor: Erhard Weigel

Philosophical work
- Era: 17th-century philosophy
- Region: Western philosophy
- School: Natural law
- Institutions: University of Heidelberg; University of Lund
- Main interests: Jurisprudence, political philosophy, economics, history
- Notable ideas: Natural law as a secular discipline

Signature
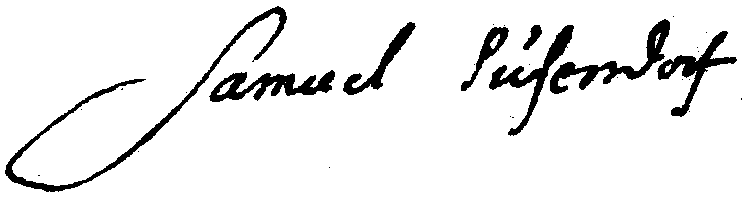

Samuel von Pufendorf (/ˈpuːfəndɔːrf/; German: [ˈpuːfəndɔʁf]; 8 January 1632 – 26 October 1694) was a German jurist, political philosopher, economist and historian. He was born Samuel Pufendorf and ennobled in 1694; he was made a baron by Charles XI of Sweden a few months before his death at age 62. Among his achievements are his commentaries and revisions of the natural law theories of Thomas Hobbes and Hugo Grotius.

His political concepts are part of the cultural background of the American Revolution. Pufendorf is seen as an important precursor of the German Enlightenment. He was involved in constant quarrels with clerical circles and frequently had to defend himself against accusations of heresy, despite holding largely traditional Christian views on matters of dogma and doctrine.

== Early life ==
Pufendorf was born at Dorfchemnitz in the Electorate of Saxony. His father Esaias Elias Pufendorf from Glauchau was a Lutheran pastor, and Samuel Pufendorf himself was destined for the ministry.

Educated at the Fürstenschule at Grimma, he was sent to study theology at the University of Leipzig. The narrow and dogmatic teaching was repugnant to Pufendorf, and he soon abandoned it for the study of public law.

Leaving Leipzig altogether, Pufendorf relocated to University of Jena, where he formed an intimate friendship with Erhard Weigel, the mathematician, whose influence helped to develop his remarkable independence of character. Under the influence of Weigel, he started to read Hugo Grotius, Thomas Hobbes and René Descartes.

Pufendorf left Jena in 1658 as Magister and became a tutor in the family of Peter Julius Coyet, one of the resident ministers of King Charles X Gustav of Sweden, at Copenhagen with the help of his brother Esaias, a diplomat in the Swedish service.

At this time, Charles was endeavoring to impose an unwanted alliance on Denmark. In the middle of the negotiations he opened hostilities and the Danes turned with anger against his envoys. Coyet succeeded in escaping, but the second minister, Steno Bielke, and the rest of the staff were arrested and thrown into prison. Pufendorf was held in captivity for eight months. He occupied himself in meditating upon what he had read in the works of Hugo Grotius and Thomas Hobbes, and mentally constructed a system of universal law. At the end of his captivity, he accompanied his pupils, the sons of Coyet, to the University of Leiden.

== Career as author ==
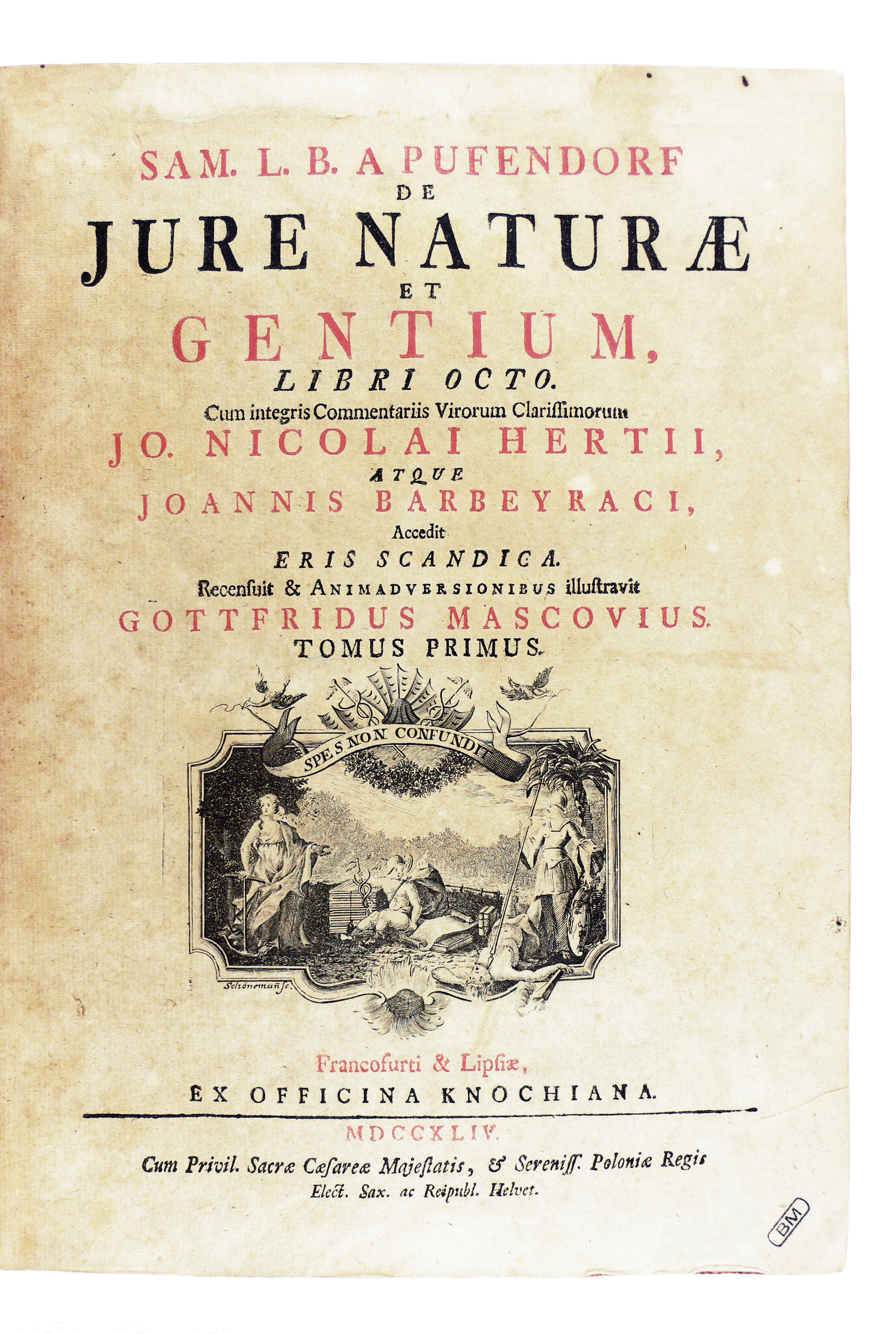
De jure naturae et gentium, 1744

At Leiden, he was permitted to publish, in 1660, the fruits of his reflections under the title of Elementa jurisprudentiae universalis libri duo ("Elements of Universal Jurisprudence: Two Books"). The work was dedicated to Charles Louis, elector palatine, who created for Pufendorf a new chair at the University of Heidelberg, that of the law of nature and nations. This professorship was first of its kind in the world. Pufendorf married Katharina Elisabeth von Palthen, the widow of a colleague, in 1665.

In 1667 he wrote, with the assent of the elector palatine, a tract De statu imperii germanici liber unus ("On the Present State of the German Empire: One Book"). Published under the cover of a pseudonym at Geneva in 1667, it was supposed to be addressed by a gentleman of Verona, Severinus de Monzambano, to his brother Laelius. The pamphlet caused a sensation. Its author directly challenged the organization of the Holy Roman Empire, denounced in the strongest terms the faults of the house of Austria, and attacked with vigour the politics of the ecclesiastical princes. Before Pufendorf, Bogislaw Philipp von Chemnitz, publicist and soldier, had written, under the pseudonym of "Hippolytus a Lapide", De ratione status in imperio nostro romano-germanico ("On The Reason of the Present State in Our Holy Roman Empire"). Inimical, like Pufendorf, to the Austrian House of Habsburg, Chemnitz had gone so far as to make an appeal to France and Sweden. Pufendorf, on the contrary, rejected all idea of foreign intervention, and advocated that of national initiative.

When Pufendorf went on to criticise a new tax on official documents, he did not get the chair of law and had to leave Heidelberg in 1668. Chances for advancement were few in a Germany that still suffered from the ravages of the Thirty Years' War (1618–1648), so Pufendorf went to Sweden where that year he was called to the University of Lund. His sojourn there was fruitful.

In 1672 appeared De jure naturae et gentium libri octo ("On The Law of Nature and of Nations: Eight Books") and of, and in 1673 a résumé of it under the title De officio hominis et civis iuxta legem naturalem ("On the Duty of Man and Citizen, according to Natural Law"), which, among other topics, gave his analysis of just war theory. In De jure naturae et gentium Pufendorf took up in great measure the theories of Grotius and sought to complete them by means of the doctrines of Hobbes and of his own ideas on jus gentium ("Law of Man"). His first important point was that natural law does not extend beyond the limits of this life and that it confines itself to regulating external acts. He disputed Hobbes's conception of the state of nature and concluded that the state of nature is not one of war but of peace. But this peace is feeble and insecure, and if something else does not come to its aid it can do very little for the preservation of mankind.

As regards public law Pufendorf, while recognizing in the state (civitas) a moral person (persona moralis), teaches that the will of the state is but the sum of the individual wills that constitute it, and that this association explains the state. In this a priori conception, in which he scarcely gives proof of historical insight, he shows himself as one of the precursors of Rousseau and of the Contrat social. Pufendorf powerfully defends the idea that international law is not restricted to Christendom, but constitutes a common bond between all nations because all nations form part of humanity.

In 1677 Pufendorf was called to Stockholm as Historiographer Royal. To this new period belong Einleitung zur Historie der vornehmsten Reiche und Staaten ("Introduction to the History of the Most Distinguished Kingdoms and States" as well as Commentarium de rebus suecicis libri XXVI., ab expeditione Gustavi Adolphi regis in Germaniam ad abdicationem usque Christinae and De rebus a Carolo Gustavo gestis. In his historical works, Pufendorf wrote in a very dry style, but he professed a great respect for truth and generally drew from archival sources. However, his historical works were heavily pro-Swedish and he supported the claim that eastern Denmark was originally Swedish. In 1658 Denmark was forced to cede the eastern provinces of Skåne (Scania), Halland, and Blekinge (plus some Norwegian territories) to Sweden. Pufendorf defended this move and insisted that these provinces were "reunited" with Sweden and that the Scanian provinces had always belonged to "Götaland". He wrote that "Sweden’s old borders have been healed again". In De habitu religionis christianae ad vitam civilem he traces the limits between ecclesiastical and civil power. This work propounded for the first time the so-called "collegial" theory of church government (Kollegialsystem), which, developed later by the learned Lutheran theologian Christoph Matthäus Pfaff, formed the basis of the relations of church and state in Germany and more especially in Prussia.

This theory makes a fundamental distinction between the supreme jurisdiction in ecclesiastical matters (Kirchenhoheit or jus circa sacra), which it conceives as inherent in the power of the state in respect of every religious communion, and the ecclesiastical power (Kirchengewalt or jus in sacra) inherent in the church, but in some cases vested in the state by tacit or expressed consent of the ecclesiastical body. The theory was of importance because, by distinguishing church from state while preserving the essential supremacy of the latter, it prepared the way for the principle of toleration. It was put into practice to a certain extent in Prussia in the 18th century; but it was not till the political changes of the 19th century led to a great mixture of confessions under the various state governments that it found universal acceptance in Germany. The theory initially found no acceptance in the Roman Catholic Episcopate, but it nonetheless made it possible for the Protestant governments to make a working compromise with Rome in respect of the Roman Catholic Church established in their states.

In 1688 Pufendorf was called into the service of Frederick William, Elector of Brandenburg. He accepted the call, but he had no sooner arrived than the elector died. His son Frederick III fulfilled the promises of his father; and Pufendorf, historiographer and privy councillor, was instructed to write a history of the Elector Frederick William (De rebus gestis Frederici Wilhelmi Magni).

The King of Sweden continued to testify his goodwill towards Pufendorf, and in 1694 created him a baron. In the same year while still in Sweden, Pufendorf suffered a stroke, and died on 26 October 1694 in Berlin. He was buried in the church of St Nicholas, where an inscription to his memory is still to be seen. He was succeeded as historiographer in Berlin by Charles Ancillon.

== De iure naturae et gentium ==
In 1672 appeared De iure naturae et gentium. This work took largely the theories of Grotius and many ideas from Hobbes, adding to them Pufendorf's own ideas to develop the law of nations. Pufendorf argues that natural law does not extend beyond the limits of this life and merely regulates only external acts. He also challenges the Hobbesian thesis of a state of nature which is a state of war or conflict. For Pufendorf too there is a state of nature, but it is a state of peace. This natural peace, however, is weak and uncertain. In terms of public law, which recognizes the state (civitas) as a moral person (persona moralis), Pufendorf argues that the will of the state is nevertheless nothing more than the sum of the individual wills that are associated within it; hence the state needs to submit to a discipline essential for human safety. This 'submission', in the sense of obedience and mutual respect, is for Pufendorf the fundamental law of reason, which is the basis of natural law. He adds that international law should not be limited or restricted only to the Christian nations, but must create a common link between all peoples, since all nations are part of humanity.

== De Officio Hominis et Civis Juxta Legem Naturalem ==
In De Officio Hominis et Civis Juxta Legem Naturalem ("On the Duty of Man and Citizen"), Pufendorf divides duties into several categories: duties towards God, duties towards oneself, and various forms of duty towards others. Duties towards oneself were classified as "duties of the soul", such as developing skills and talents, and "duties of the body", which involve not doing harm to oneself.

== Legacy and reputation ==
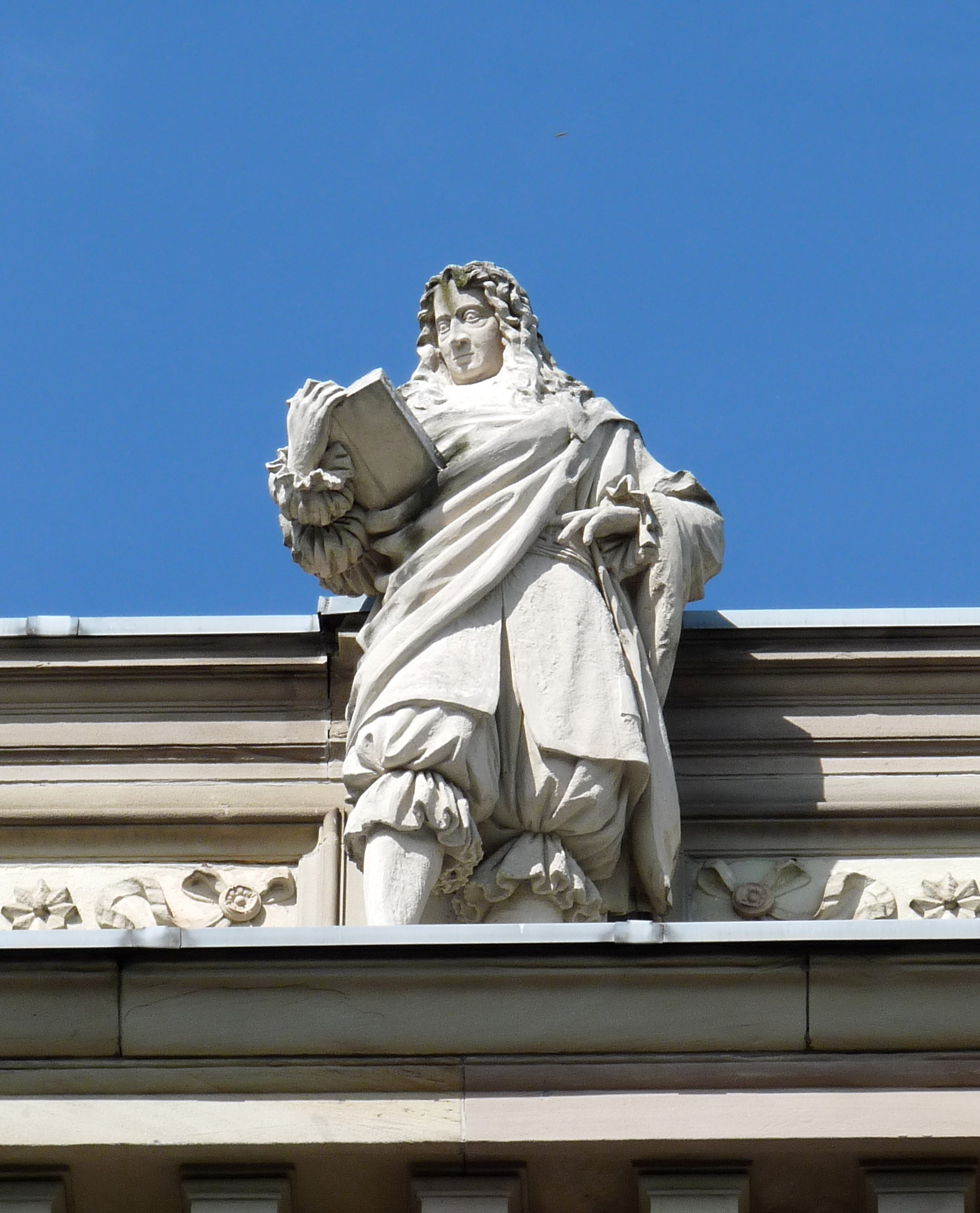
Statue of Pufendorf on the Palais Universitaire, Strasbourg, France.

John Locke, David Hume, Edward Gibbon, Voltaire, Jean-Jacques Rousseau, and Denis Diderot all recommended Pufendorf's inclusion in law curricula, and he greatly influenced Blackstone and Montesquieu.

Pufendorf's feuds with Leibniz diminished his reputation. Pufendorf and Leibniz shared many theological views, but differed in their philosophical foundation, with Pufendorf leaning toward Biblical fundamentalism. It was on the subject of the pamphlet of Severinus de Monzambano that their quarrel began. Leibniz once dismissed him as "Vir parum jurisconsultus, minime philosophus" ("A man barely a jurist, let alone a philosopher").

== Works ==
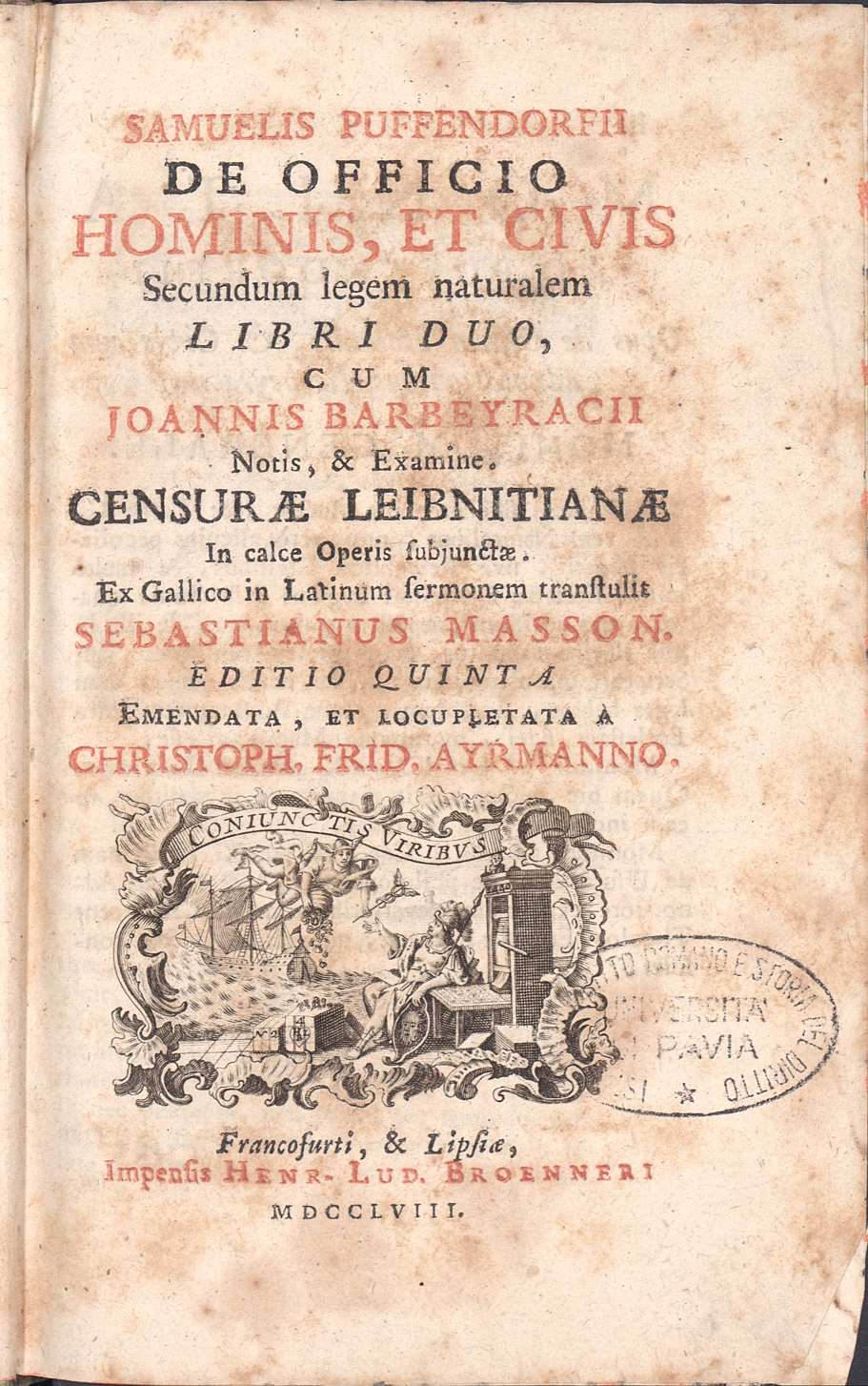
De officio hominis et civis juxta legem naturalem, 1758

- Craig L. Carr (ed.), The Political Writings of Samuel Pufendorf (Oxford 1994)
- Elementorum iurisprudentiae universalis (1660)
- von Pufendorf, Samuel (1660). Elementorum Iurisprudentiae Universalis libri duo [Elements of Universal Jurisprudence] (in Latin). Haga Comitum: Adriani Vlacq.
- von Pufendorf, Samuel (1663). De Obligatione Adversus Patriam (in Latin). Heidelbergae: Wyngaerden.
- De rebus gestis Philippi Augustae (1663)
- von Pufendorf (alias de Monzambano), Samuel (alias Severinus) (1667). De statu imperii Germanici ad Laelium fratrem, Dominum Trezolani, liber unus (in Latin). Geneva: Petrum Columesium.
- De statu imperii Germanici (Amsterdam 1669)
- von Pufendorf, Samuel (1672). De Jure Naturae Et Gentium Libri Octo [On the Law of Nature and of Nations] (in Latin). Londini Scanorum: Junghans.
- von Pufendorf, Samuel (1673). De Officio Hominis et Civis Juxta Legem Naturalem [On the Duty of Man and Citizen According to Natural Law] (in Latin). Londini Scanorum: Junghans. OCLC 759611925.
  - English translation: von Pufendorf, Samuel (1927). De Officio Hominis et Civis Juxta Legem Naturalem Libri Duo [On the Duty of Man and Citizen According to Natural Law]. Translated by Moore, Frank Gardner. New York: Oxford University Press. OCLC 1110799161.
- von Pufendorf, Samuel (1683). Einleitung zu der Historie der Vornehmsten Reiche und Staaten, so itziger Zeit in Europa sich befinden (in German). Franckfurt am Mayn: Knoch.
- Commentarium de rebus suecicis libri XXVI., ab expeditione Gustavi Adolphi regis in Germaniam ad abdicationem usque Christinae
- De rebus a Carolo Gustavo Sueciae rege gestis commentariorum (Stockholm 1679)
- von Pufendorf, Samuel (1695). De Rebus Gestis Friderici Wilhelmi Magni, Electoris Brandenburgici, Commentariorum Libri Novendecim (in Latin). Vol. I. Berolini: Schrey.
- von Pufendorf, Samuel (1695). De Rebus Gestis Friderici Wilhelmi Magni, Electoris Brandenburgici, Commentariorum Libri Novendecim (in Latin). Vol. II. Berolini: Schrey.
