= Niccolò Zucchi =

Italian Jesuit, astronomer, and physicist

Reverend Niccolò Zucchi
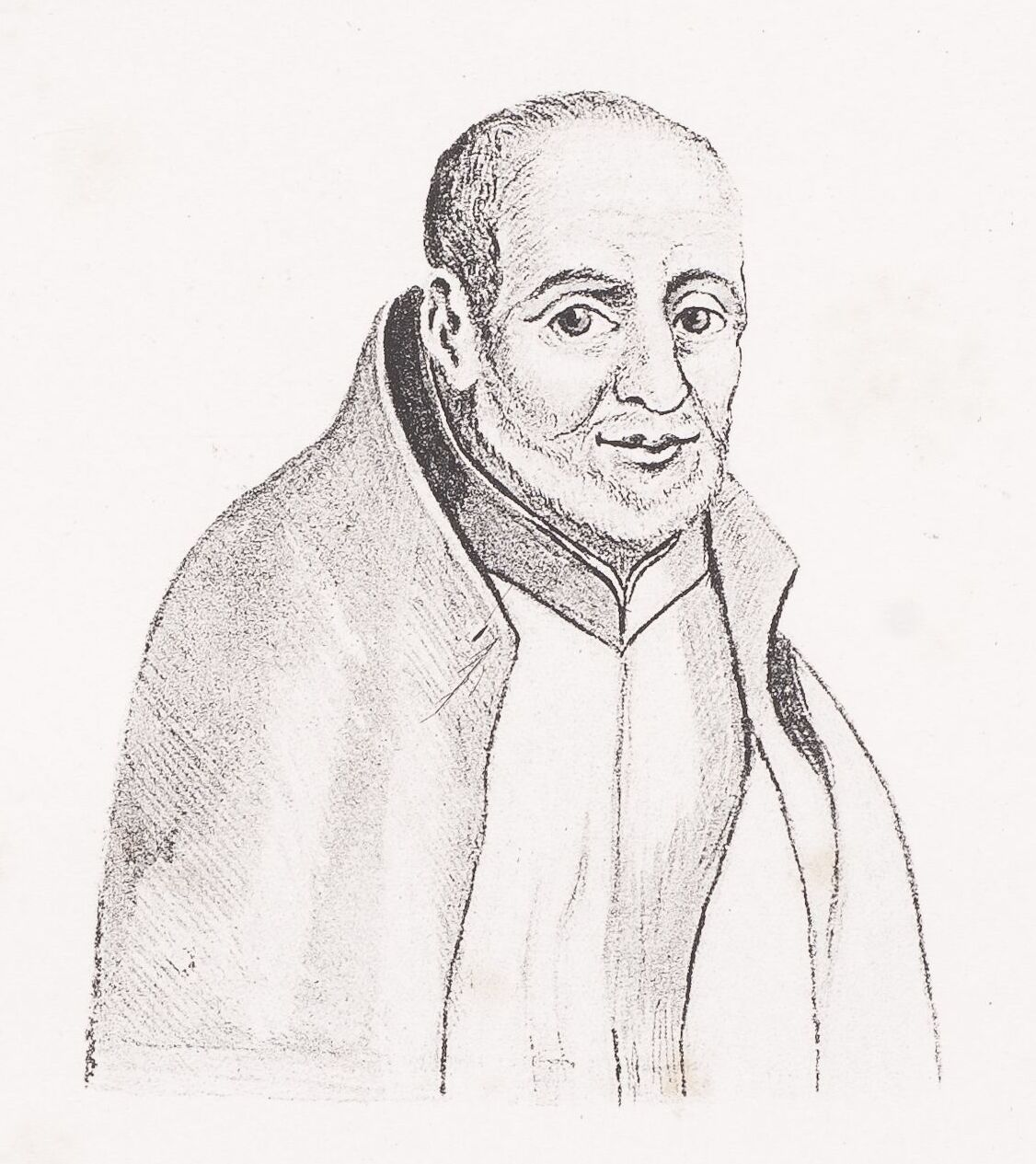
- Niccolò Zucchi
- Born: 6 December 1586; Parma, Duchy of Parma
- Died: 21 May 1670 (aged 83); Rome, Papal States
- Known for: physics, astronomy, reflecting telescope
- Parent(s): Pietro Zucchi and Francesca Zucchi (née Giandemaria)
- Scientific career
- Fields: Astronomy
- Workplaces: Roman College

Niccolò Zucchi (Italian pronunciation: [nikkoˈlɔ dˈdzukki, - tˈtsukki]; 6 December 1586 – 21 May 1670) was an Italian Jesuit, astronomer, and physicist.

As an astronomer he may have been the first to see the belts on the planet Jupiter (on 17 May 1630), and reported spots on Mars in 1640.

His "Optica philosophia experimentis et ratione a fundamentis constituta", published in 1652–56, described his 1616 experiments using a curved mirror instead of a lens as a telescope objective, which may be the earliest known description of a reflecting telescope. In his book, he also demonstrated that phosphors generate rather than store light. He also published two other works on mechanics and machines.

== Biography ==
Niccolò Zucchi was the fourth of eight children born into the noble family of Pierre Zucchi and Francoise Giande Marie. Three of his sisters became nuns, three of his brothers became Jesuits, and one brother became a secular priest.

=== The Jesuit order ===
Niccolò studied rhetoric in Piacenza and philosophy and theology in Parma. He finished his studies at the age of sixteen and entered the Jesuit order in Padua on 28 October 1602, in which he remained for the rest of his life.

Zucchi taught mathematics, rhetorics and theology as a professor at the Collegio Romano, and then was appointed as rector of a new Jesuit college in Ravenna by Cardinal Alessandro Orsini. He later served as the apostolic preacher, a post often referred to as “preacher to the pope”, for about seven years. He received patronage from Ranuccio II Farnese, Duke of Parma, to which Zucchi dedicated his book Nova de machinis philosophia in 1642. He also dedicated his 1652 book Optica philosophia, to Archduke Leopold of Austria. Near the end of his life, he was an official of the Jesuit house in Rome. Zucchi died in Rome on 21 May 1670.

== Scientist ==
Niccolò Zucchi published many books on science, including two works on the "philosophy of machines" (analyses of mechanics) in 1646 and 1649, and Optica philosophia in 1652. He also wrote an unpublished Optica statica, which has not survived. Some of the subjects Zucchi wrote about were magnetism, barometers (denying the existence of the vacuum), and demonstrated that phosphors generate rather than store light. He also asserted that since Venus represented beauty, it was closer to the Sun than Mercury (which represented skill).

=== Astronomer ===
In 1623, Zucchi was a member of a Papal legate sent to the court of Ferdinand II. There he met Johannes Kepler, the German mathematician and astronomer.

Kepler encouraged Zucchi's interest in astronomy. Zucchi maintained correspondence with Kepler after returning to Rome. At one point when Kepler was in financial difficulties, Zucchi, at the urging of the Jesuit scientist Father Paul Guldin, gave a telescope of his own design to Kepler, who mentioned the gift in his book “The Dream”.

Zucchi along with fellow Jesuit Daniello Bartoli may have been the first to see the belts on the planet Jupiter on May 17, 1630, and Zucchi reported spots on Mars in 1640. The crater Zucchius on the Moon is named in Niccolò Zucchi's honour. Bartoli wrote his Jesuit biography (1682).

=== Books ===
- Nova de machinis philosophia, Rome, 1649. (in Latin) Digitized by e-rara
- Optica philosophia experimentis et ratione a fundamentis constituta (1652–56)

== Zucchi and the reflecting telescope ==
One of the things cited by Zucchi in his 1652 book "Optica philosophia experimentis et ratione a fundamentis constituta" is his claim of exploring the idea of a reflecting telescope in 1616. Zucchi described an experiment he did with a concave lens and a bronze parabolic mirror he found in a cabinet of curiosities. Zucchi used the concave lens as an eyepiece, trying to observe the focused image produced by the mirror to see if it would work like a telescope. Although Zucchi described the mirror as "ab experto et accuratissimo artifice elaboratum nactus" (fabricated by an experienced craftsman) he apparently did not get a satisfactory image with it, possibly due to the mirror not being accurate enough to focus an image, the angle it was tilted at, or the fact that his head partially obstructed the view. Zucchi abandoned the idea. If Niccolò Zucchi's claim of exploring the idea of a reflecting telescope in 1616 was true, then it would be the earliest known description of the idea of using a curved mirror as an image forming objective, predating Galileo Galilei and Giovanni Francesco Sagredo's discussions of the same idea in the 1620s.

=== Claimed functionality ===
There are many descriptions of Niccolò Zucchi successfully using his early "reflecting telescope". The French author Bernard le Bovier de Fontenelle's 1700 work History of the Academy of Sciences stated Zucchi used it to observe "celestial and terrestrial objects". There are also modern claims that Zucchi used a reflecting telescope to observe the belts of Jupiter and examine the spots on the planet Mars,

Such claims have been disputed. The 1832 Edinburgh Encyclopædia noted Zucchi's use of a tilted mirror "must have distorted and spoiled the image" and the 1858 Encyclopædia Britannica described Fontenelle's claim as "recklessly (ascribing) the invention" Historian Al Van Helden notes in his The Galileo Project that the claims Zucchi used a reflecting telescope to observe Jupiter and Mars as "wildly improbable". Henry C. King in his work on The History of the Telescope noted that Zucchi was using a refracting (Galilean) telescope in his astronomical work and a publication by the British Astronomical Association notes for some of his observations Zucchi was using refracting telescopes manufactured by Eustachio Divini and Giuseppe Campani.

== See also ==
- List of Jesuit scientists
- List of Roman Catholic scientist-clerics
- Zucchius (crater), lunar crater named after Niccolò Zucchi
