= Zucchius (crater) =

Lunar surface depression

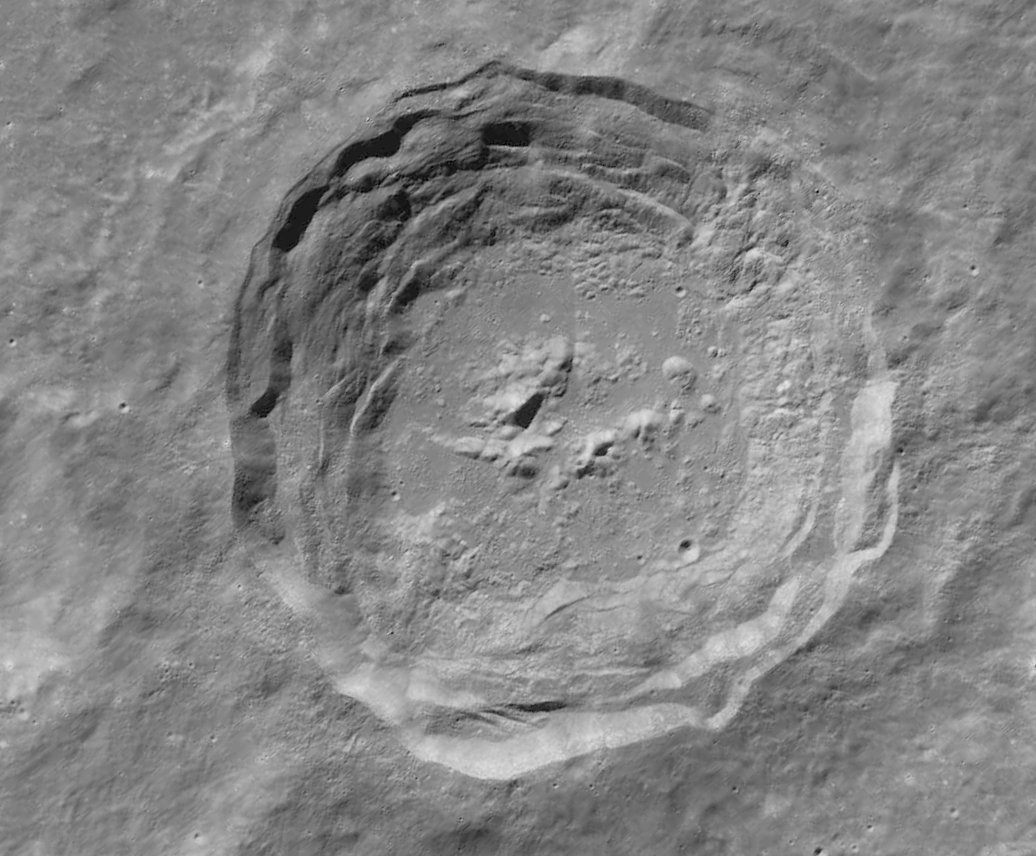
- LRO image
- Coordinates: 61.4°S 50.3°W
- Diameter: 64 km (40 mi)
- Depth: 4.81 km (2.99 mi)
- Colongitude: 52° at sunrise
- Eponym: Niccolò Zucchi

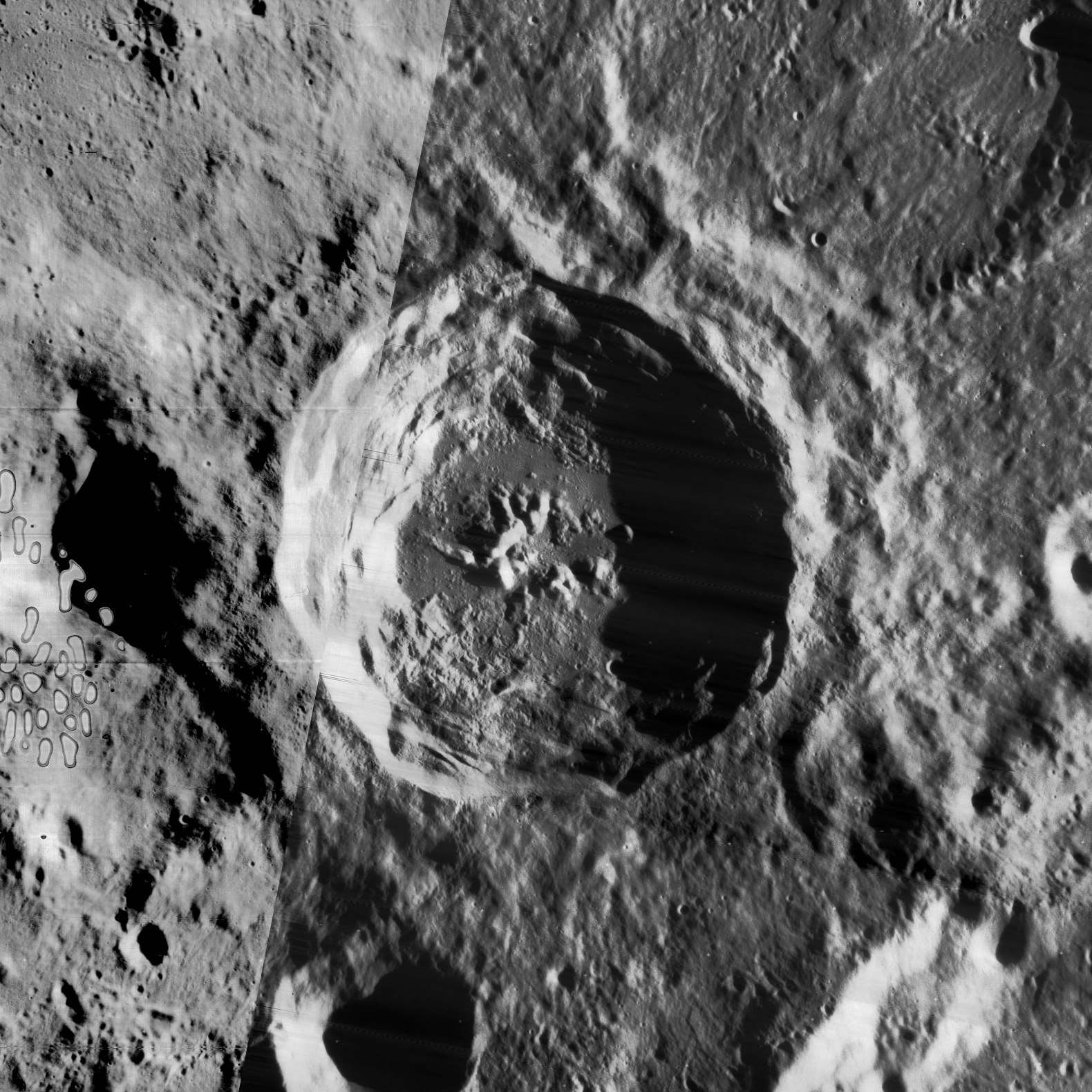
Mosaic of Lunar Orbiter 4 images

Zucchius is a prominent lunar impact crater located near the southwestern limb. Because of its location the crater appears oblong-shaped due to foreshortening. It lies just to the south-southwest of the crater Segner, and northeast of the much larger walled plain named Bailly. To the southeast is Bettinus, a formation only slightly larger than Zucchius.

The crater rim is symmetrical and shows little significant wear from impacts. The inner wall is terraced, and there is a group of small central peaks that forms a curving arc around the middle of the floor, making it a complex crater. The spectra of the central peak fits a noritic gabbro mineralogy, which originated from a depth of 6.4 to 9.9 km. Due to its ray system, Zucchius is mapped as part of the Copernican System.

To the northeast of Zucchius is the Schiller-Zucchius Basin, a Pre-Nectarian peak ring basin. This basin has received the unofficial designation 'Schiller Annular Plain' among lunar observers.

== Satellite craters ==
By convention these features are identified on lunar maps by placing the letter on the side of the crater midpoint that is closest to Zucchius.

Zucchius	Latitude	Longitude	Diameter
A	61.8° S	56.0° W	28 km
B	61.8° S	54.3° W	25 km
C	60.8° S	45.2° W	22 km
D	61.4° S	58.7° W	26 km
E	61.3° S	60.6° W	21 km
F	60.1° S	56.5° W	8 km
G	60.5° S	57.2° W	25 km
H	61.0° S	59.7° W	14 km
K	64.3° S	58.0° W	10 km
