= Segner (crater) =

Lunar surface depression

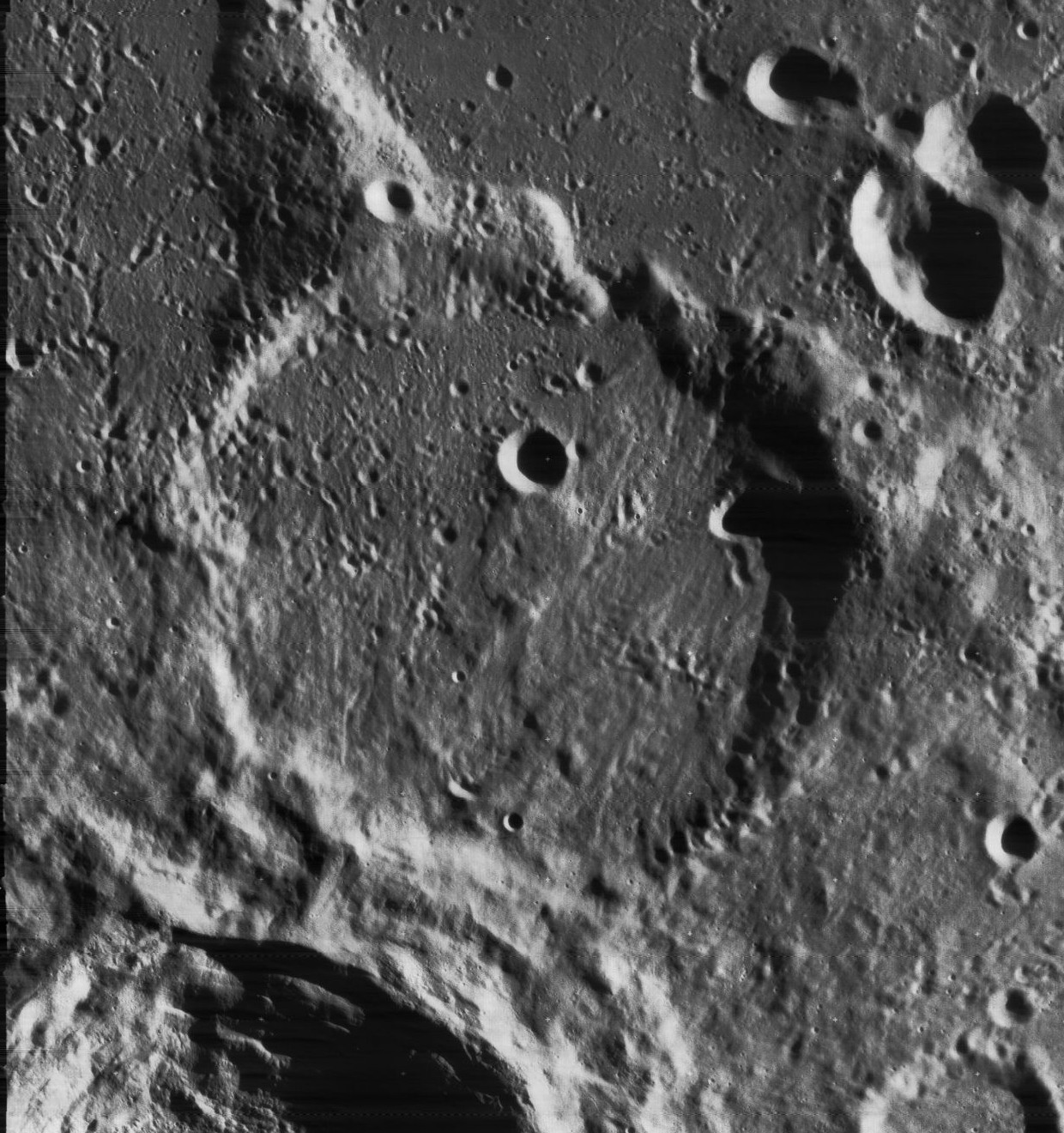
- Lunar Orbiter 4 image
- Coordinates: 58.9°S 48.3°W
- Diameter: 67 km
- Depth: 1.3 km
- Colongitude: 48° at sunrise
- Eponym: Johann A. von Segner

Segner is a lunar impact crater located near the southwestern limb of the Moon, to the northeast of Bailly, a giant walled plain. The crater Zucchius is a few kilometers to the south-southwest of the rim, and to the north east lies the unusual formation Schiller. The smaller crater Weigel is located to the east.

Segner has a low, worn rim, and is generally much less prominent than the nearby Zucchius. The floor is distinguished only by a pair of small craterlets and a slightly undulating surface. There is no indication of a central peak. A low ridge runs to the north from the edge of the northern rim.

Segner lies within the southwest portion of the Schiller-Zucchius Basin.

== Satellite craters ==
By convention these features are identified on lunar maps by placing the letter on the side of the crater midpoint that is closest to Segner.

Segner	Latitude	Longitude	Diameter
A	57.2° S	47.0° W	9 km
B	57.8° S	56.0° W	35 km
C	57.7° S	45.9° W	19 km
E	57.6° S	56.9° W	13 km
G	56.4° S	55.3° W	12 km
H	58.4° S	48.0° W	7 km
K	56.1° S	54.1° W	10 km
L	58.7° S	47.0° W	5 km
M	59.8° S	45.3° W	5 km
N	59.2° S	44.2° W	5 km
