= Mario Bettinus =

Italian mathematician, astronomer and philosopher (1582–1657)

Reverend Mario Bettinus
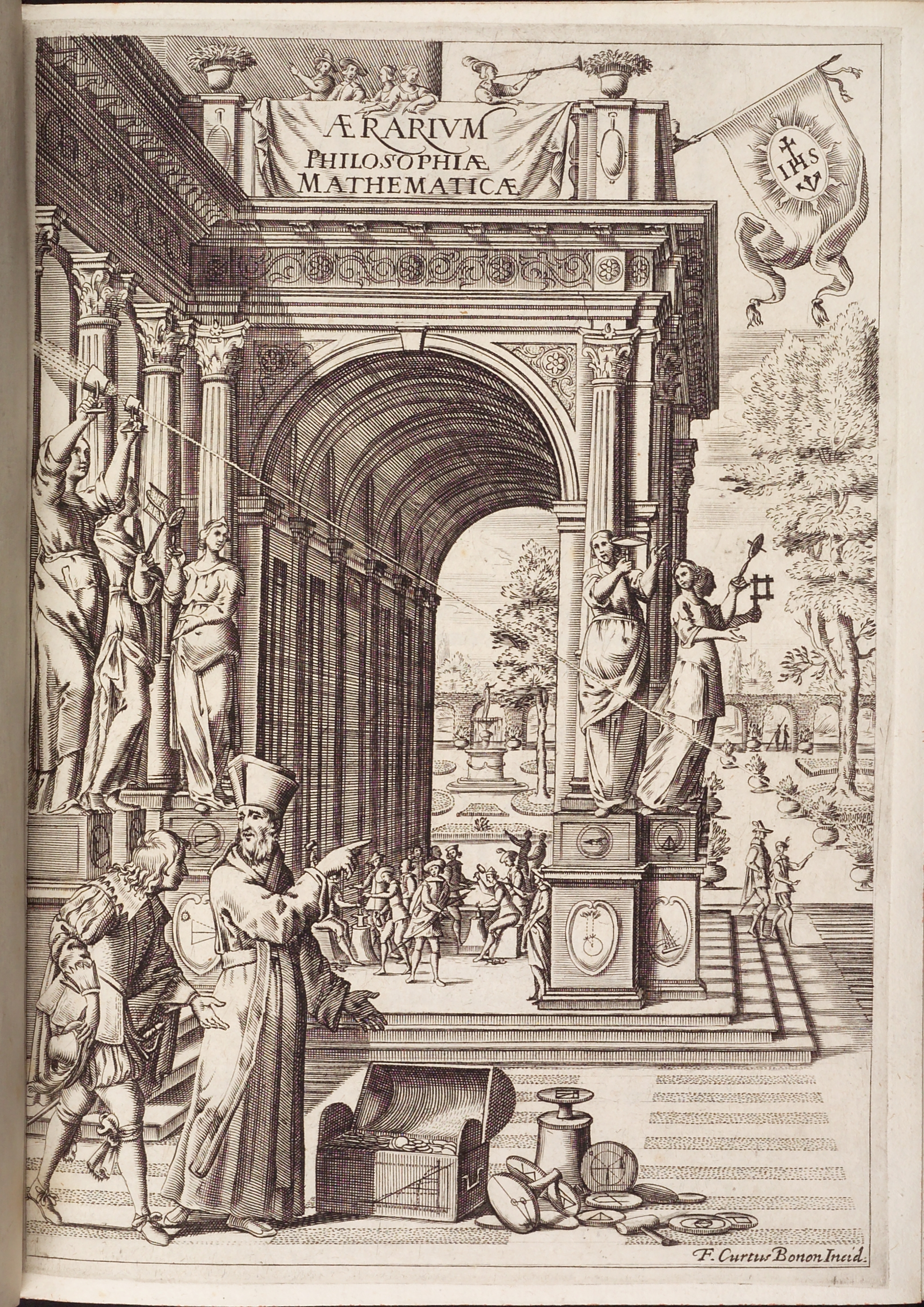
- Frontispiece of Mario Bettini's Aerarium Philosophiae Mathematicae. An elderly Jesuit man (possibly Bettini himself), gestures towards the garden at right, where young men enjoy mathematic instruments, which are also being used by the statues that surround the loggia in the middle ground.
- Born: February 6, 1582; Bologna, Papal States
- Died: 7 November 1657 (aged 75); Bologna, Papal States
- Other names: Mario Bettini
- Occupations: Jesuit; mathematician; philosopher; scientist
- Known for: Apiaria Universae Philosophiae Mathematicae
- Scientific career
- Notable students: Giovanni Battista Riccioli; Daniello Bartoli

Mario Bettinus SJ (Italian: Mario Bettini; 7 November 1657) was an Italian Jesuit philosopher, mathematician and astronomer. The lunar crater Bettinus was named after him by Giovanni Riccioli in 1651.

== Biography ==
Mario Bettinus studied mathematics under the Belgian Jean Verviers and Giuseppe Biancani at the Jesuit College of S. Rocco, in Parma. When Biancani died in 1624, the chair of mathematics went to Bettini, who taught military art, stereometry, and conics theory. He was also responsible for teaching military architecture during the period 1624–1630. Among the students attending his classes were the two sons of Duke Ranuccio, Ottavio and Odoardo. Besides being Ottavio's teacher of military mathematics, Bettinus also served as military consultant to the courts of Parma (1612–1613), Modena (1617–1618) and again Parma (1626–1627), and as a military architect at Novellara (1618–1619), seat of the novitiate of the Jesuit ‘Provincia Veneta’.

Bettinus was primarily a mathematician and mathematical physicist. He labeled himself a philosophus mathematicus, meaning a scholar who relies on mathematics to study natural philosophy. Bettinus was somewhat ambivalent towards Galileo's Copernicanism and his new astronomical observations. Although generally recognizing the importance of Galileo's discoveries, he disagreed with some of the conclusions expounded in Sidereus Nuncius especially over the height of the mountains on the moon. According to Bettini, if there were very high mountains on the Moon, the lunar disk observed with the telescope would appear irregular and jagged, while on the contrary, it looked perfectly round. Bettini's objections echoed the doubts raised in Johannes Kepler's Dissertatio cum Nuntio Sidereo. Giovanni Riccioli, who heard Bettinus lecture at Parma, mentions his attempts to measure the heights of lunar mountains.

Besides being the mentor of Guarino Guarini (1624–1683) and a friend of Christoph Grienberger, Bettinus was also a close friend of Prince Raimondo Montecuccoli (1609–1680)—the latter had even sent him a copy of his work on fortifications from Hohenegg on 15 July 1652. He opposed Bonaventura Cavalieri's method of indivisibles and the theory of the infinitesimal quantities.

== Works ==
Bettinus privileged mathematics, intended as the only discipline abstract enough to allow intellect to approach theology. The Jesuit mathematician held the belief that, precisely because of their abstraction, mathematical theorems and demonstrations lead one away from the mundane and toward the divine. On the contrary, he considered a research based on sense as too bound to human limitations (and, therefore, unreliable). Yet, Bettinus was a skilled astronomer; and clues of experimental knowledge are all but invisible in his work.

His best-known work is Apiaria Universae Philosophiae Mathematicae 'Beehives of all mathematical philosophy' (1645), an encyclopedic collection of mathematical curiosities. This book, reflecting his many interests, is a collection of scientific mysteries embracing everything from geometrical demonstrations to illusionistic stage sets, perpetual motion machines, anamorphoses and sundials. The second volume has a section on music and acoustics. According to Bettinus, the natural world abounds in mathematical delights such as spider webs and the honeycombs of bees. From these creations of nature can be drawn geometrical principles useful for mechanical, optical, and artistic designs. The Apiaria surveys a staggering array of instruments, machines, and other tangible applications of mathematical principles. It is illustrated with beautiful engravings of these machines, which – Bettini points out – are rough imitations of the great and perfect mechanisms provided by nature. The work included a commentary on the first six books of Euclid, a traditional part of Jesuit mathematical curriculum and a form followed by Clavius a half century earlier.

In his Apiaria military technologies featured prominently. His machines of war were mentioned by Montecuccoli, by the famous Jesuit mathematicians Athanasius Kircher and Jacques Ozanam and by the Polish master of artillery, Casimir Semenowycz. The book was a huge success throughout Europe. It was read by John Collins and Isaac Barrow and a copy of it can be found in the library of the English physician and philosopher Sir Thomas Browne.

== Publications ==
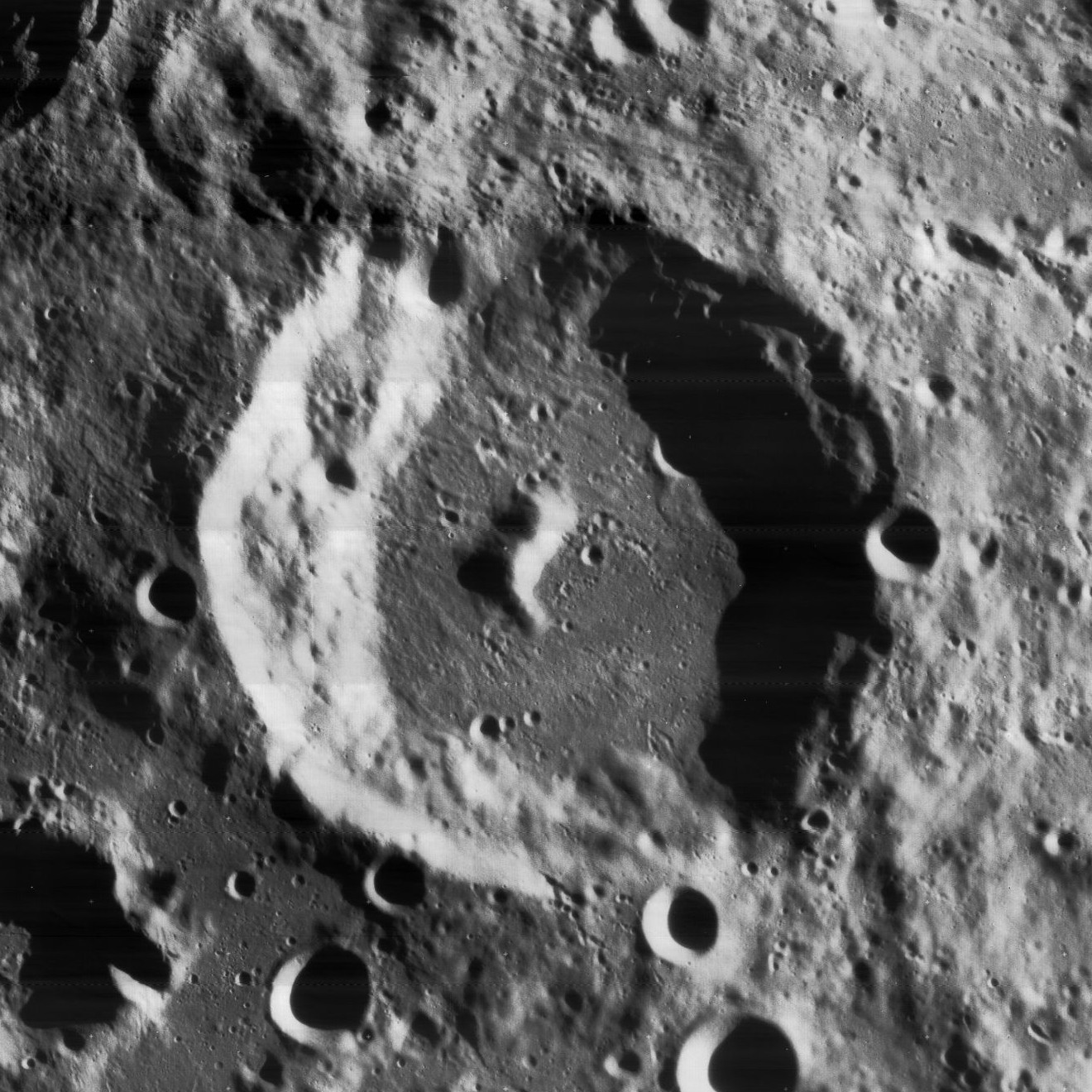
Moon crater named after Bettinus

- Apiaria Universae Philosophiae Mathematicae, in quibus Paradoxa, et nova pleraque machinamenta ad usus eximios traducta et facillimis demonstrationibus confirmata exhibentur, 3 vols. Bologna: Typis Io. Baptistae Ferronij, Venice: Apud Paulum Baleonium, 1642–55. The 'paradoxes' are of many different kinds—scientific ideas contrary to general opinion, logical and mathematical paradoxes, geometrical problems which had not yielded to solution, curious machines and engines, illusions, games, and tricks. Bettinus tackled the 'learned hallucinations' constellated about the quadrature problem, and about asymptotic lines which go de infinito infinito, as well as those that result from deformation of the rules of perspective. Archimedes' screw (which raised by lowering itself), wedges, levers all make their appearance, magnificently illustrated.
- Aerarium philosophiae mathematicae (in Latin). Vol. 1. Bologna: Giovanni Battista Ferroni. 1647.
  - Aerarium philosophiae mathematicae (in Latin). Vol. 2. Bologna: Giovanni Battista Ferroni. 1648.
    - Aerarium philosophiae mathematicae (in Latin). Vol. 3. Bologna: Giovanni Battista Ferroni. 1648.

== See also ==
- List of Jesuit scientists
- List of Roman Catholic scientist-clerics

== Bibliography ==
- Aricò, Denise (1996). Scienza, teatro e spiritualità barocca: il gesuita Mario Bettini. Bologna: CLUEB. ISBN 9788880913177.
- Aricò, Denise (2002). "Politica e istruzione alla corte di Ranuccio Farnese: i gesuiti Mario Bettini e Jean Verviers". In Gian Paolo Brizzi; Roberto Greci (eds.). Gesuiti e università in Europa (secoli XVI-XVIII) Atti del Convegno di studi. Parma, 13-15 dicembre 2001. Bologna: CLUEB. pp. 213–242. doi:10.1400/35003.
- Aricò, Denise (2006). "Una corrispondenza fra il gesuita bolognese Mario Bettini e Raimondo Montecuccoli". Filologia e Critica. XXXI (2): 288–312. doi:10.1400/81069.
- Gatto, Romano (2019). "Jesuit mathematics". In Ines G. Županov (ed.). The Oxford Handbook of the Jesuits. Oxford: Oxford University Press. p. 637-669. ISBN 9780190639655.
- Cocks, Elijah E.; Cocks, Josiah C. (1995). Who's Who on the Moon: A Biographical Dictionary of Lunar Nomenclature. Tudor Publishers. ISBN 9780936389271.
