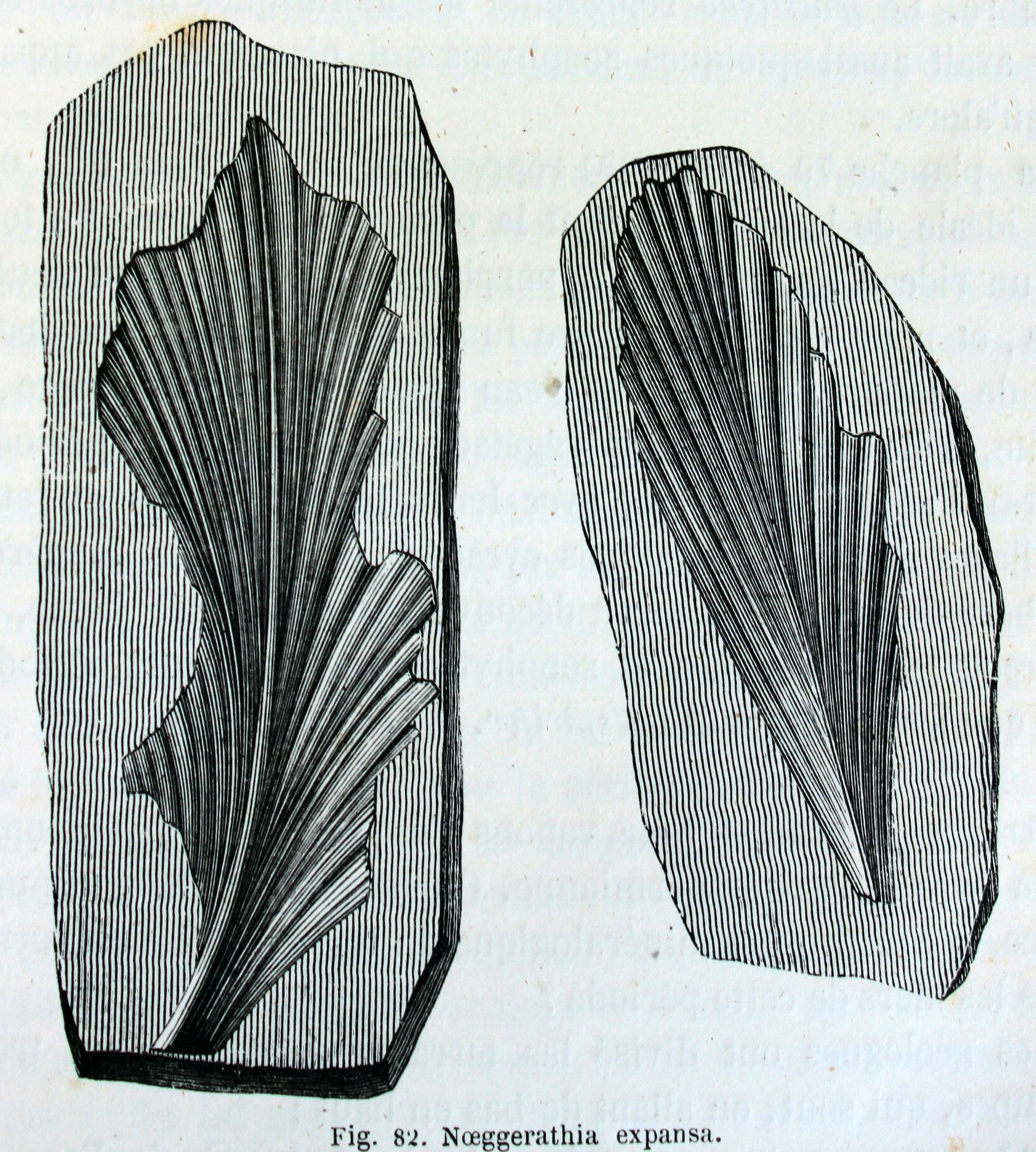
- 1863 reconstruction of Noeggerathia expansa

Scientific classification
- Kingdom: Plantae
- Clade: Tracheophytes
- Class: †Progymnospermopsida
- Order: †Noeggerathiales
- Family: †Noeggerathiaceae
- Genus: †Noeggerathia; Sternb., 1820

Type species
- Noeggerathia foliosa Sternb.

Species
- See text

= Noeggerathia =

Noeggerathia Temporal range: Late Carboniferous–Early Permian

Extinct genus of plants

Noeggerathia is an extinct genus of noeggerathialean plant that lived during the Late Carboniferous and Early Permian periods.

== Description ==
Noeggerathia could grow to be 3 ft, 3 in tall. It is known for its compound leaves, each possessing two rows of leaflets which composed a 12-inch frond. Noeggerathia may also have possessed a short trunk.

The genus may have possessed strobili at the ends of its branches for reproductive purposes. Biseriate sporophylls existed on either side of the cones. It has been previously suggested that Noeggerathiostrobus may have been borne at the end of Noeggerathia's stems. However, it is more likely that Noeggerathiostrobus was borne closer to the base of Noeggerathia.

== Taxonomy ==
Noeggerathia was named after Johann Jakob Nöggerath, a geologist from Germany. The genus was described in 1820 by Kaspar Maria von Sternberg.

Noeggerathia and noeggerathialeans in general have been described as difficult to classify as early as 1906 and as recently as 2009. In 1906, the genus was believed to belong to Cycadaceae, a family currently consisting of only Cycas.

The species described under Noeggerathia include the following:

- Noeggerathia dickeri Horowitz
- Noeggerathia foliosa Sternb.
- Noeggerathia intermedia Feistm.
- Noeggerathia obovata Carruth.
- Noeggerathia speciosa Ettingsh.
- Noeggerathia zalesskyi Fissunenko
- Noeggerathia zamitoides Sterzel

== Fossil sites ==
Specimens of Noeggerathia have been discovered worldwide. As of 1906, Noeggerathia was known from finds in the European Coal Measures and was considered rare there.

Several well-preserved specimens of Noeggerathia and related plants have been discovered in the Bohemian Massif, with N. foliosa having the most complete fossil record in that area. N. dickeri has been described from the Upper Sandstone Formation of the Sinai Peninsula.
