= Schiller-Zucchius Basin =

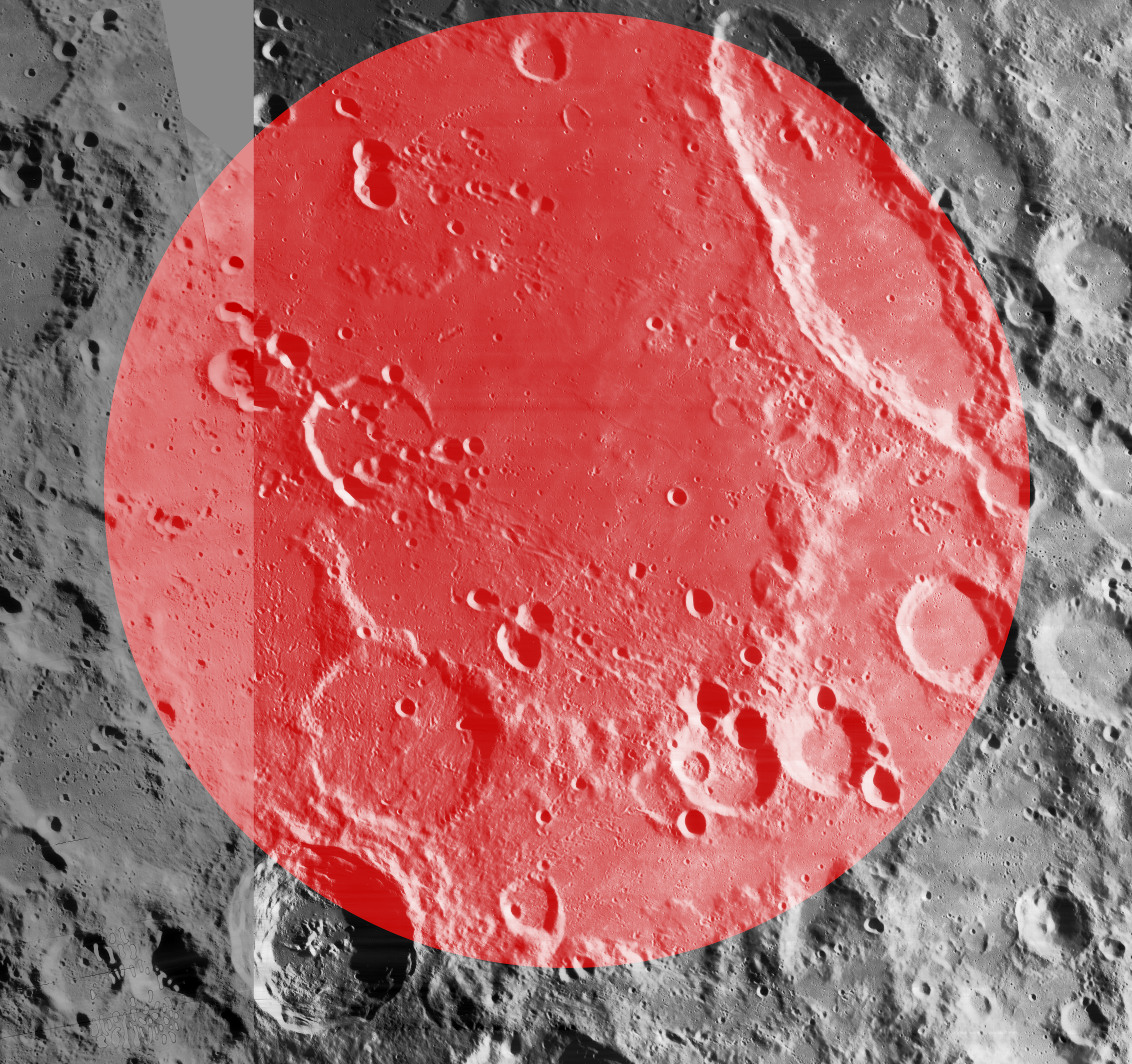
- Lunar Orbiter 4 image showing most of the basin, highlighted in red
- Coordinates: 56.0°S 045.0°W
- Diameter: 325 km
- Eponym: Schiller and Zucchius craters

The Schiller-Zucchius Basin is a Pre-Nectarian impact basin on the near side of the Moon. It is named after the elongated crater Schiller at the northeast margin and fresh crater Zucchius near the southwest margin. This basin has received the unofficial designation 'Schiller Annular Plain' among lunar observers.

The basin has a clear but eroded outer rim and a partial inner ring. It is thus an example of a peak ring basin.

Also at the center is a mass concentration (mascon), or gravitational high. The mascon was first identified by Doppler tracking of the Lunar Prospector spacecraft. The existence of the mascon was confirmed by the GRAIL spacecraft.

Other craters within the basin include Segner and Weigel, as well as many satellite craters. Due south of the basin is Bettinus, to the northwest of the basin are Phocylides and Nasmyth, to the north is Nöggerath, and to the east is Rost.

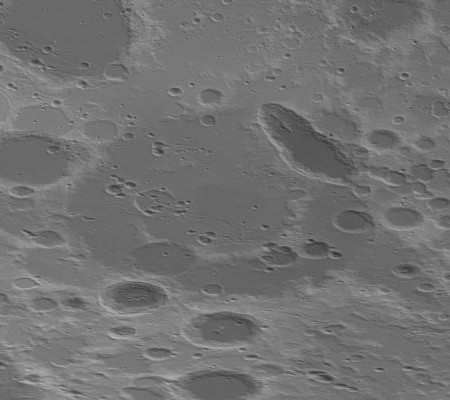
Topographic map

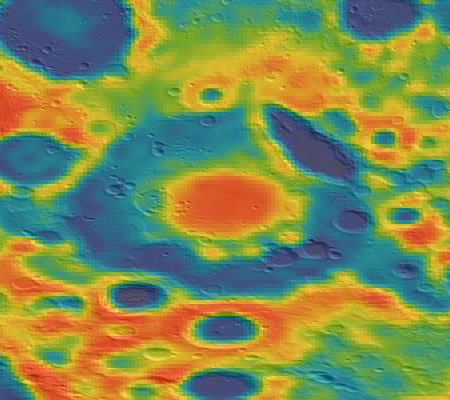
Gravity map based on GRAIL

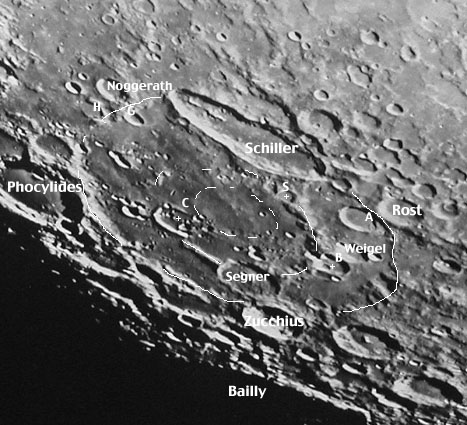
Earth-based image showing the basin with labeled features
