= Johann Leonhard Rost =

German astronomer (1688–1727)

Johann Leonhard Rost (12 February 1688 – 22 March 1727) was a German astronomer and author from Nuremberg. He wrote under the alias Meletaon.

The crater Rost on the Moon is named after him.

His brother Johannes Carolus Rost was a famous doctor from Nuremberg, he is mostly known to be the personal doctor of Anna Maria Franziska of Saxe-Lauenburg.

== Bibliography ==
- Meletaon, "Schau-Platz der gelährten und galanten Welt", 1711.
- Meletaon, "Die Unglückseelige Atalanta", 1717.
- Rost, J. L., "Atlas Portatilis Coelestis", 1723.
