= Johann Jakob Nöggerath =

German mineralogist and geologist (1788–1877)

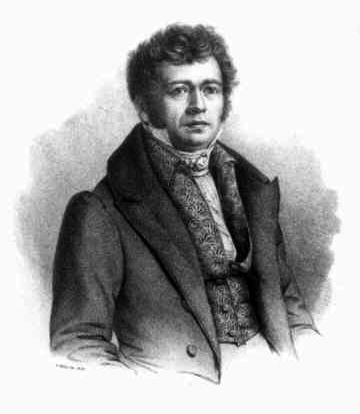
Johann Jakob Nöggerath.

Johann Jakob Nöggerath (also as Johann Jacob Noeggerath) (10 October 1788 – 13 September 1877), German mineralogist and geologist, was born at Bonn.

In 1814-1815 he became a commissioner of mines for some of the Rhine provinces, and in 1818 became an associate professor at the newly established University of Bonn. In 1821 he was named a full professor of mineralogy and mining sciences at Bonn, where he also served as director of the university's natural history museum. He obtained a very fine collection of minerals for the museum, was eminently successful as a teacher, and achieved a wide reputation among mining engineers.

The following are his more important publications:

- Über aufrecht im Gebirgsgestein eingeschlossene fossile Baumstämme und andere Vegetabilien (1819–1821).
- Das Gebirge in Rheinland-Westphalen, nach mineralogischem und chemischem Bezuge (4 volumes, 1822–1826).
- Die Entstehung und Ausbildung der Erde, vorzüglich durch Beispiele aus Rheinland-Westphalen erläutert (1843).
- Der Laacher See und seine vulkanischen Umgebungen (1870).

The Carboniferous plant Noeggerathia, allied to the genus Zamia and to cycads, is named after him, as is the lunar crater Nöggerath. He died at Bonn.
