= Johann Andreas Segner =

Hungarian scientist (1704–1777)

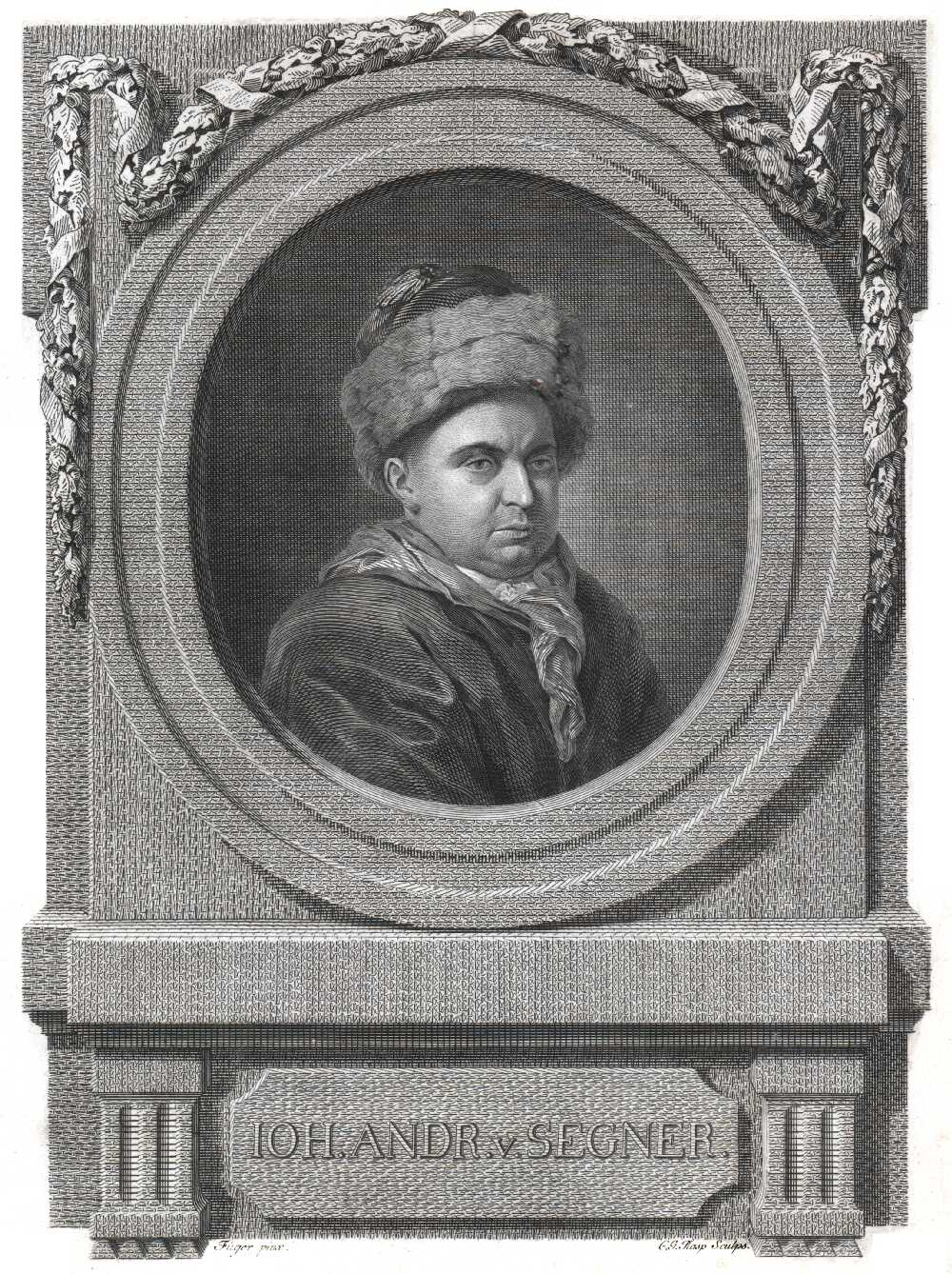
- Johann Andreas Segner's portrait
- Born: 9 October 1704; Pozsony, Kingdom of Hungary (now Bratislava, Slovakia)
- Died: 5 October 1777 (aged 72); Halle, Duchy of Magdeburg, (now Halle, Germany)
- Citizenship: Kingdom of Hungary
- Known for: Segner wheel
- Scientific career
- Fields: Mathematics
- Workplaces: Jena; Göttingen; Halle
- Doctoral advisor: Georg Erhard Hamberger; Simon Paul Hilscher
- Doctoral students: Johann Georg Büsch

Johann Andreas von Segner (Hungarian: Segner János András, German: Johann Andreas von Segner, Slovak: Ján Andrej Segner, Latin: Iohannes Andreas de Segner; October 9, 1704 – October 5, 1777) was a Hungarian scientist of German descent. He was born in the Kingdom of Hungary, in the former Hungarian capital city of Pozsony, or Pressburg (today Bratislava).

== Early life and education ==
Johann Segner was born to Johann Michael von Segner and his wife Christine von Segner (née Fischer) on probably the 10 October 1704. Other sources mention also the 4 or the 9 October. His father was a tax clerk. His paternal ancestors came from Styria to Pressburg in the Kingdom of Hungary; by the 18th century. In 1596 the family was granted nobility for their military accomplishments by Rudolph II. He studied at Pressburg and Debrecen. In April 1725, Segner began studying at the University of Jena. Under the guidance of Georg Erhard Hamberger, Segner developed an evidence for the cartesian rule of signs. In his third year at Jena, he began to teach other students in mathematics. During his stay in Jena, he was supported by Hermann Friedrich Teichmeyer, who lectured at the faculty of medicine. In October 1729, he graduated under Simon Paul Hirscher from the faculty of medicine. Following he returned to Pressburg where he worked as a medic until December 1731. Following he worked temporarily as the city physician in Debrecen until early 1732. In 1732 he returned to Jena where he requested a degree from the faculty of philosophy and also the possibility to give lectures in the faculty of philosophy. He graduated in May 1732 he began to lecture in 1733. In September the same year he was nominated a professor in the faculty of philosophy where he soon lectured the metaphysics of Christian Wolff.

== University of Göttingen ==
The university in Göttingen was established after a visit by George II to Hanover in 1732. After Hamberger was denied his resignation from the University of Jena, he suggested von Segner instead. 1735 Segner became the professor of mathematics and physics at the University of Göttingen. As in January 1736 the professor for medicine died, he also lectured in the faculty of medicine.

== University of Halle ==
After Christian Wolff died, the Prussian King Friedrich II requested from the mathematician Leonhard Euler advice on who could be succeed Wolff at the University of Halle. Euler suggested Daniel Bernoulli who did not accept. Then Euler suggested von Segner, who requested the recognition of his Hungarian title and an extraordinary treatment at the university in return of his acceptance. In 1755 he became a professor at Halle, where he divided the lectures in mathematics and physics with Johann Joachim Lange. In Halle he also established an observatory. Von Segner died on the 5 October 1777.

== Connections ==
One of the best-known scientists of his age, Segner was a member of the academies of Berlin, London, and Saint Petersburg. According to Mathematics Genealogy Project, as of February 2013, he has over 66 thousand academic descendants, out of the total 170 thousand mathematicians in the database.

== Contributions ==
He was the first scientist to use the reactive force of water and constructed the first water-jet, the Segner wheel, which resembles one type of modern lawn sprinkler. Segner, also produced the first proof of Descartes' rule of signs. Historians of science remember him as the father of the water turbine. The lunar crater Segner is named after him, as is asteroid 28878 Segner.

== Personal life ==
In 1732, he married Carolina Sophia, the daughter of Hermann Friedrich Teichmeier. They had three children of which two reached adulthood.

== Works in modern edition ==
- Johann Andreas Segner, Specimen logicae universaliter demonstratae (1740) edited with an introduction by Mirella Capozzi, Bologna: CLUEB, 1990.
