= Segner wheel =

Segner-wheel: A – water inlet, B – vertical tube with rotor, C – rotor with nozzles (side view), D – rotor with nozzles ("top" view), E – hole in the ground, F – belt-pulley transmission, G – powered device

The Segner wheel or Segner turbine is a type of water turbine invented by Johann Andreas Segner in the 18th century. It uses the same principle as Hero's aeolipile.

The device is placed in a suitable hole in the ground (or at the slope of a hill). The water is delivered to the top of a vertical cylinder, at the bottom of which is a rotor with specially bent pipes with nozzles (see image). Due to the hydrostatic pressure, the water is ejected from the nozzles, causing the rotor to rotate. The useful torque is transferred to a powered device through a belt and pulley system.

Segner turbines, also called reaction or Scotch turbines, were built in the mid-1850s to power the inclined plane lifts along the Morris Canal in New Jersey. Today, the Segner wheel principle is used in irrigation sprinklers.

Alexander Bogdanov cited this an example of an important innovation which paved the way for the development of steam engines.

The turbine at Museo Hacienda Buena Vista is "the only pre-Scotch type known to exist and is the sole extant example of a pioneer and historically important machine that was invented at the close of the 17th century by Dr. Baker.... The Buena Vista turbine is, in effect, a missing link in the evolution of mechanical artifacts better known to the historians of technology." (The Journal of the Society for Industrial Archaeology, Vol. 4, No. 1 [1978], pp.55–58)."

== Gallery ==
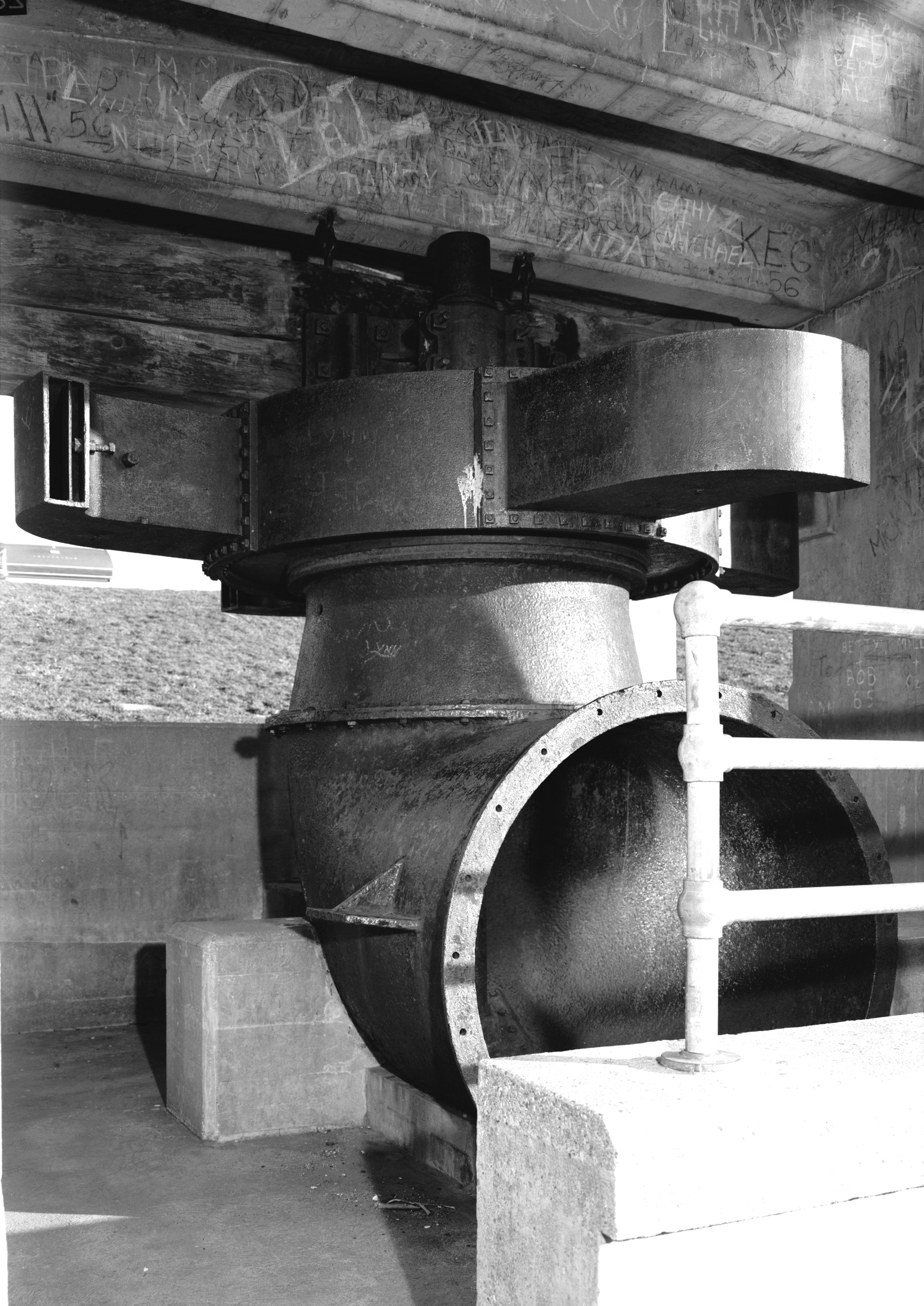
Scotch turbine from Inclined Plane 3 East of the Morris Canal at Ledgewood, New Jersey

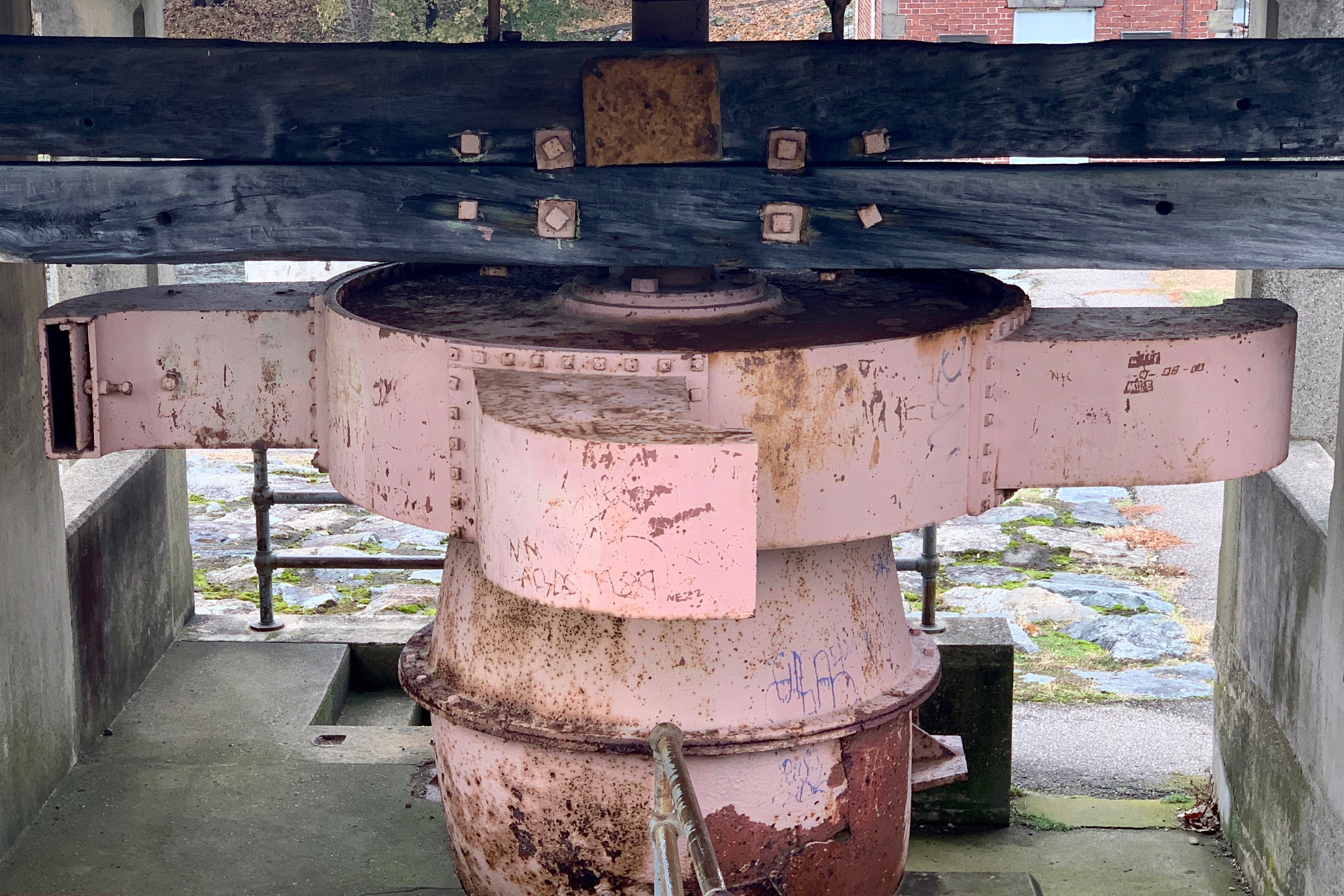
Detail view of the arms and nozzles of the turbine, on display at Hopatcong State Park
