= Schiller (crater) =

Lunar surface depression

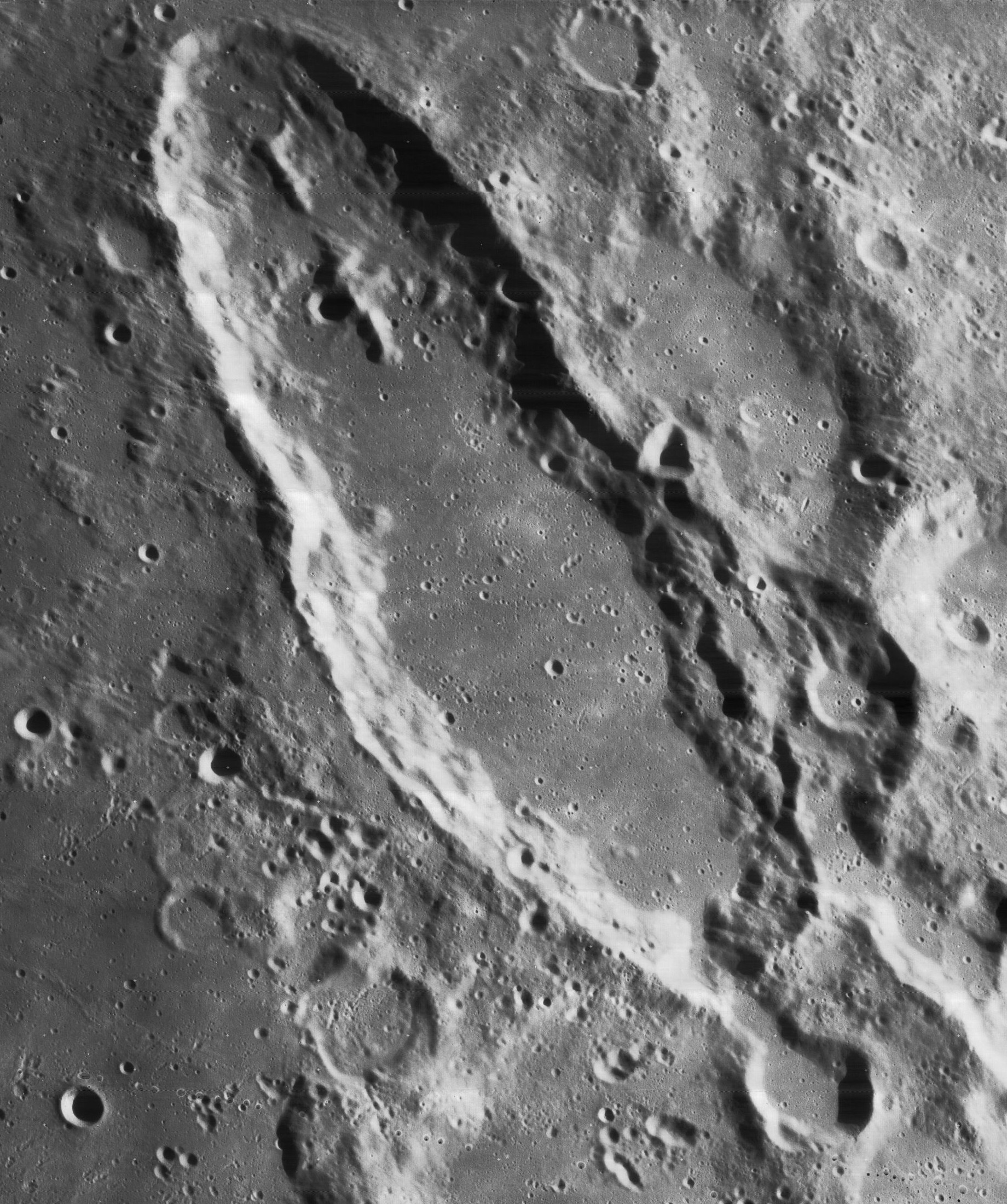
- Lunar Orbiter 4 image
- Coordinates: 51.8°S 40.0°W
- Diameter: 179 × 71 km
- Depth: 2.5 km
- Colongitude: 39° at sunrise
- Eponym: Julius Schiller

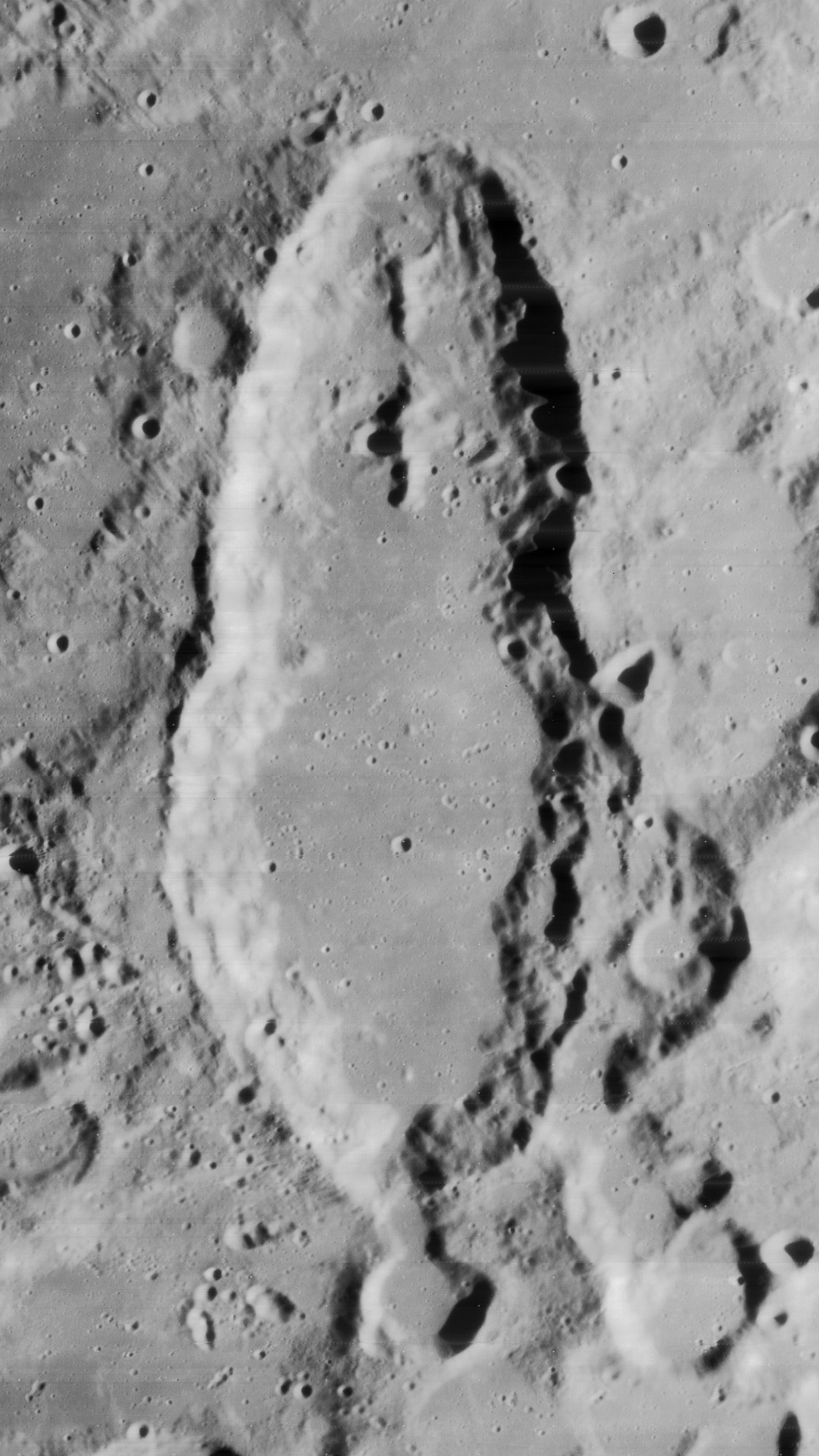
Another Lunar Orbiter 4 image

Schiller is a lunar impact crater located in the southwestern region of the Moon's near side. The rim of Schiller has an elongated shape that is amplified by its proximity to the lunar limb. The long axis lies along a line running northwest–southeast, with the wider girth located in the southeastern half. There is a slight bend in the elongation, with the concave side facing to the northeast. Schiller is thought to be a fusion of two or more craters.

The crater rim is well-defined, with a terraced inner wall and a slight outer rampart. At the southeastern end, a smaller crater is connected to Schiller by a wide valley. Most of the crater floor is flat, most likely due to lava flooding. There are some bright patches that are most clearly visible under a high sun angle. A double ridge lies along the center of the northwest crater floor, forming a nearly linear formation that divides the floor in half.

To the southwest of Schiller is the Schiller-Zucchius Basin, a Pre-Nectarian basin (peak ring basin). This basin has received the unofficial designation 'Schiller Annular Plain' among lunar observers.

== Satellite craters ==
Satellite craters are small craters located near the main crater, receiving the same name as that crater accompanied by a complementary capital letter (even if the formation of these craters is independent of the formation of the main crater).

Schiller	Latitude	Longitude	Diameter
A	47.18° S	37.65° W	10.9 km
B	48.87° S	39.15° W	17.2 km
C	55.37° S	49.31° W	45.04 km
D	55.08° S	49.36° W	9.4 km
E	54.59° S	48.8° W	7.93 km
F	50.66° S	42.99° W	12.74 km
G	51.24° S	38.3° W	8.72 km
H	50.6° S	37.74° W	72.44 km
J	49.64° S	36.69° W	9.16 km
K	46.7° S	38.77° W	10.25 km
L	47.12° S	40.23° W	10.25 km
M	48.22° S	41.26° W	8.76 km
N	53.63° S	41.98° W	6.24 km
P	53.58° S	43.66° W	6.03 km
R	52.25° S	45.87° W	7.87 km
S	54.95° S	40.42° W	21.22 km
T	50.77° S	41.29° W	6.1 km
W	54.47° S	40.97° W	15.57 km

== Views from Earth ==
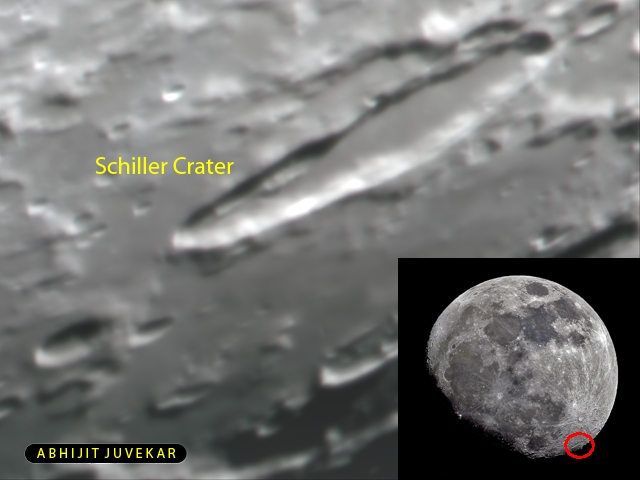

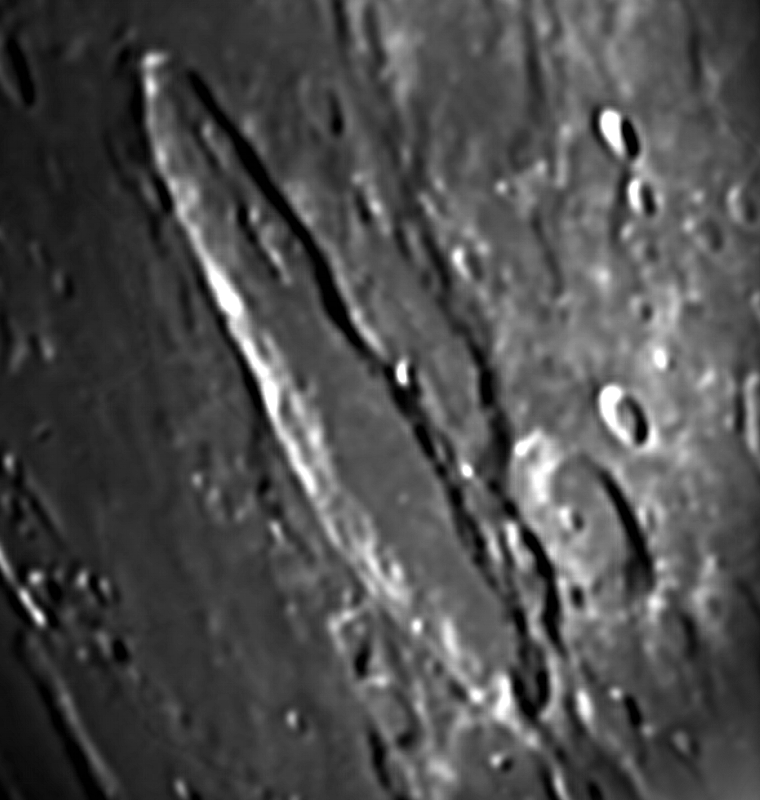

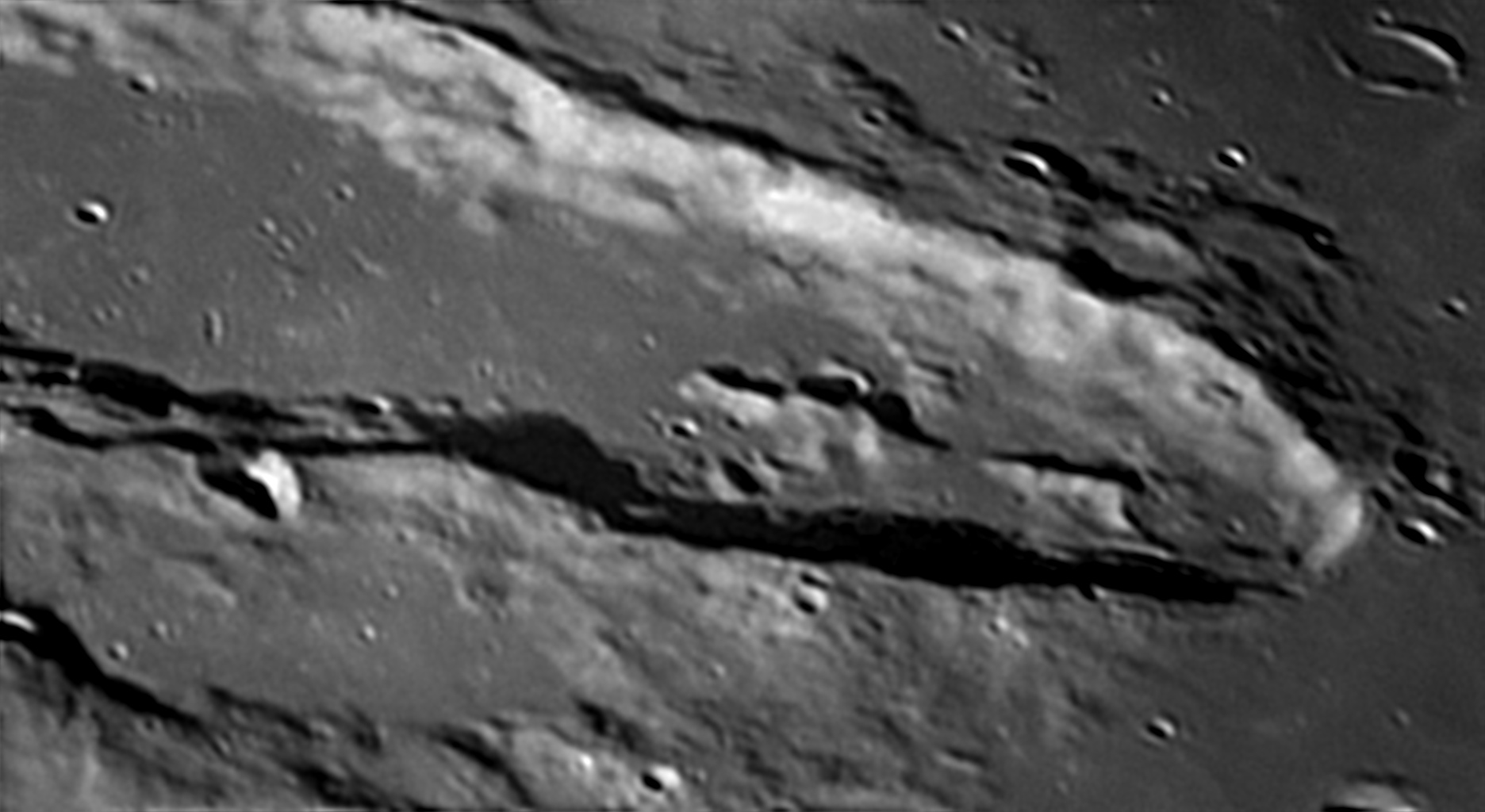

== See also ==
- Orcus Patera (Elongated Martian feature)
