= Glasgow Literary Society =

The Glasgow Literary Society (GLS) was founded in 1753, as a forum for intellectual discussions and debates. It met every Thursday from November to May. It was associated with the University of Glasgow and the Glasgow tobacco lords.

Along with the university, the Foulis press and the Foulis Academy, the Literary Society was a key institution of the Enlightenment in Glasgow.

Over time the Society developed an orientation towards scientific and technological topics, and shortly after 1800 it became the Literary and Commercial Society of Glasgow, with great input from the staff of Anderson's Institution.

The last recorded references to the Literary and Commercial Society of Glasgow were 2 pamphlets published by Thomas Atkinson in 1831, and the Society is thought to have dissolved shortly after that date.

== Notable members ==
- John Anderson
- Archibald Arthur
- Joseph Black
- Thomas Chalmers
- William Cullen
- David Hume
- William Meikleham
- John Millar
- George Muirhead
- James Mylne
- Robert Owen
- Thomas Reid
- William Richardson
- John Robison
- Adam Smith (a founding member)
- Andrew Ure
- James Watt
- Alexander Wilson
- Patrick Wilson
