= Jesuit names on the Moon craters =

Jesuit names on the Moon craters:

- Clavius (crater)
- Kircher (crater)
- Riccioli (crater)
