= Alexander MacFarlane (astronomer) =

Scottish merchant, planter and astronomer (1702–1755)

Alexander MacFarlane FRS
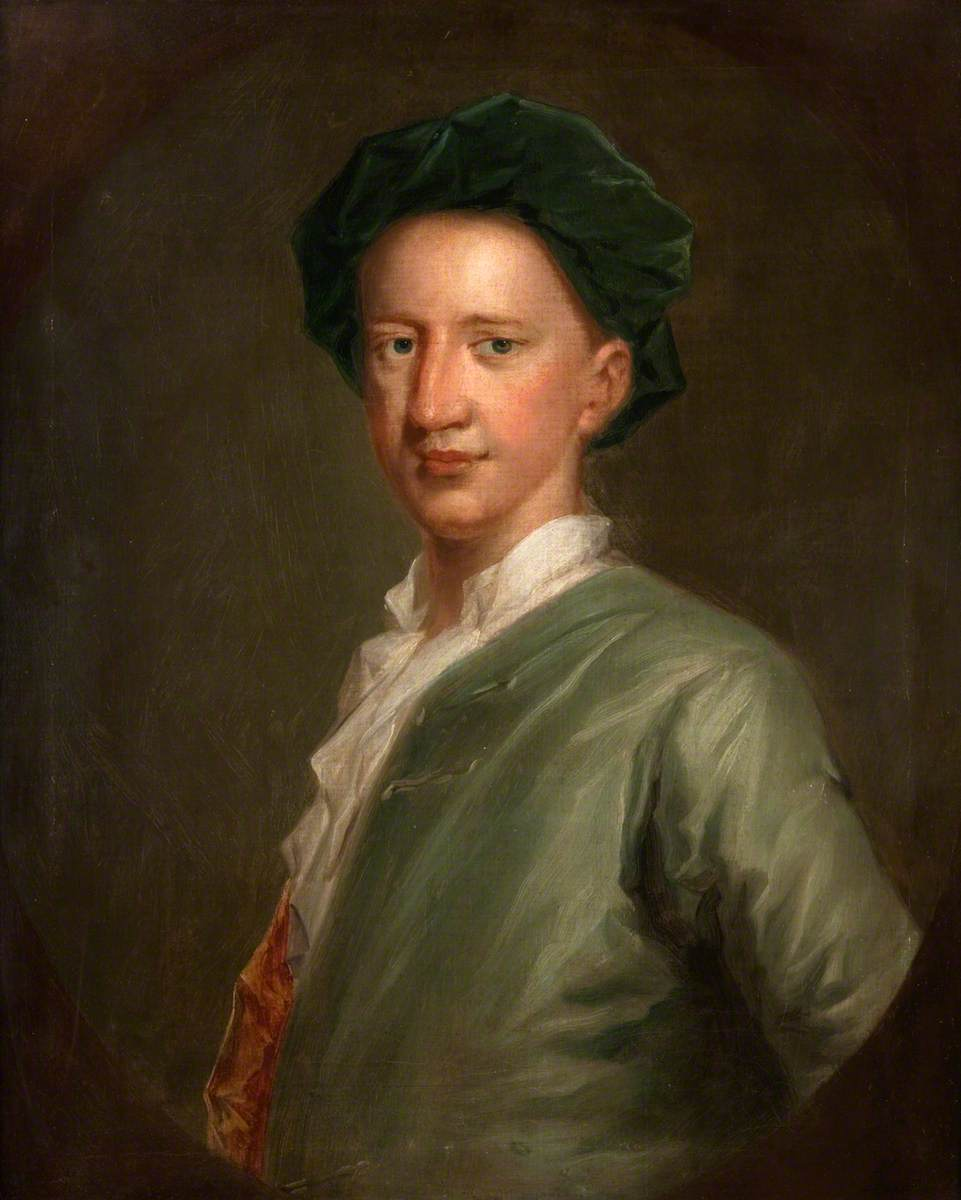
- Portrait by John Vanderbank, 1730
- Born: c. 1702; Scotland
- Died: 23 August 1755 (aged 52–53); Jamaica
- Occupations: Merchant; judge; politician; planter
- Parent(s): John MacFarlane and Lady Helen Arbuthnot

Alexander MacFarlane, FRS (c. 1702 – 23 August 1755) was a Scottish merchant, planter and astronomer. Born into an aristocratic family, he graduated from the University of Glasgow in 1728. MacFarlane subsequently emigrated to the British colony of Jamaica, where he started working as a businessman before becoming a prominent landowner and politician. He was appointed as Jamaica's first Postmaster General in 1735 and elected to the colony's House of Assembly for Saint Elizabeth Parish in 1754. At the time of his death, MacFarlane's vast estate included six sugar plantations and 761 enslaved people.

MacFarlane was also an amateur astronomer who constructed observatories in Port Royal and Kingston, equipped with a variety of instruments purchased from a fellow astronomer, Colin Campbell. His astronomical observations, though limited in scope, resulted in MacFarlane being elected as a fellow of the Royal Society in 1746. Upon his death, he bequeathed all his scientific instruments to the University of Glasgow, which the university used to established Macfarlane Observatory, the first of its kind in Great Britain. In the 21st century, his legacy has come under scrutiny due to MacFarlane's slave ownership.

== Early life ==
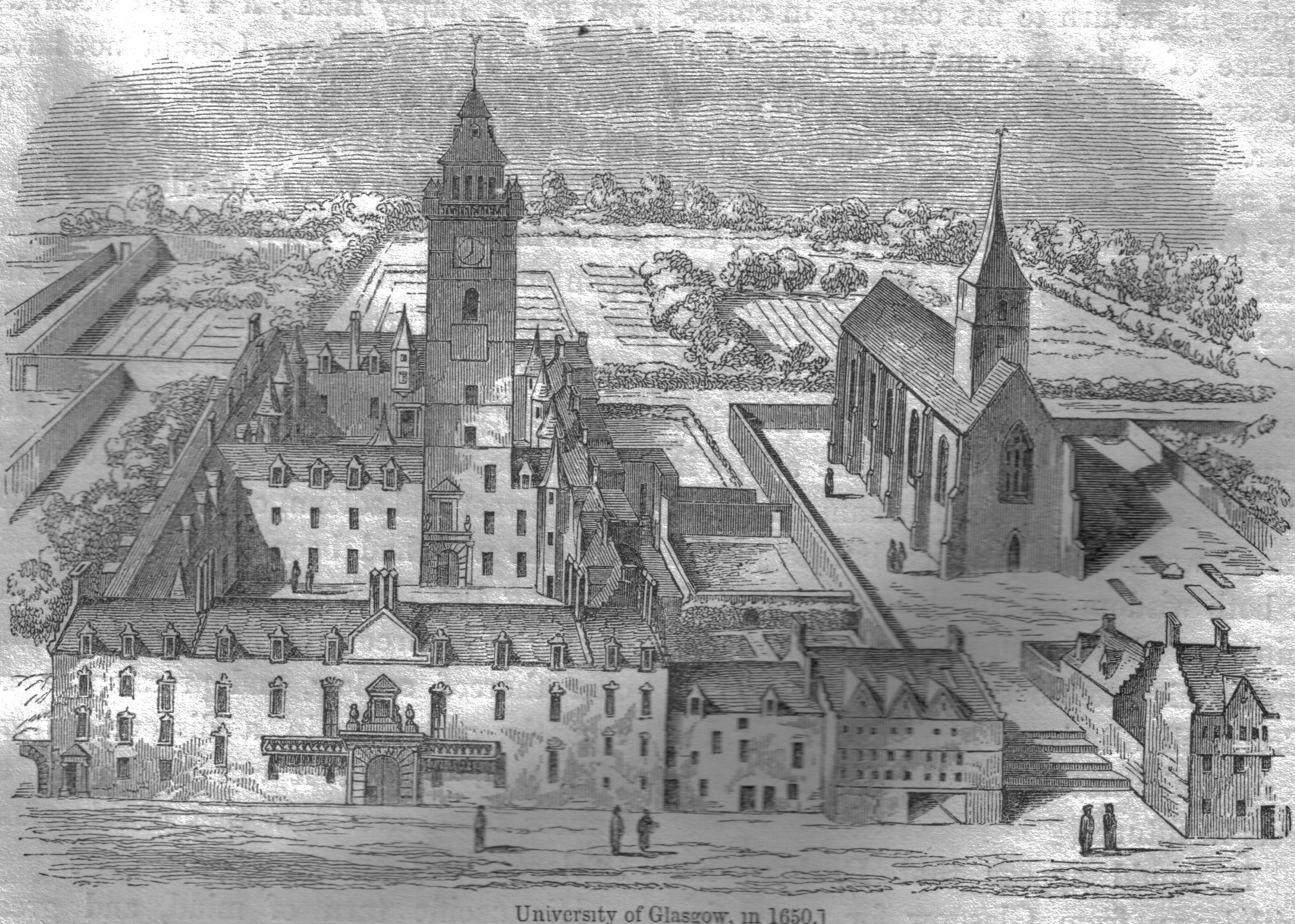
Illustration of the University of Glasgow in 1650

Alexander MacFarlane was born in the Kingdom of Scotland in c. 1702. His parents were John MacFarlane, who died in 1705, and Lady Helen Arbuthnot, a noblewoman who was the daughter of the peer Robert Arbuthnot, 2nd Viscount of Arbuthnott; the Arbuthnot family motto was Astra castra, Numen lumen (the stars my camp, the Lord my light). The youngest of four sons, MacFarlane studied at the University of Glasgow, graduating from the university with a MA degree in 1728. He subsequently moved to the British colony of Jamaica, a prominent destination for Scottish immigrants during the 18th century.

== Career in Jamaica and death ==
In Jamaica, MacFarlane began working as a merchant and gradually acquired significant landholdings throughout the colony. By 1735, he had become a prosperous businessman and assistant judge who owned several sugar plantations operated with the forced labour of enslaved Black people. In November of that year, MacFarlane was appointed the first Postmaster General of Jamaica by the colonial government. Twelve years later, in 1747, he purchased the "Biscany" slave plantation in Saint Elizabeth Parish. In 1754, MacFarlane was elected to the House of Assembly of Jamaica, representing that parish.

During this period, MacFarlane developed an interest in astronomy and mathematics. At his residence in Port Royal, he commissioned the building of an observatory which was outfitted with instruments purchased from Colin Campbell, a fellow Scot who had settled in Jamaica and also became a merchant and planter. An associate of the astronomers Edmond Halley and Joseph Harris, Campbell, who had established his own observatory in Jamaica in 1731 to study and catalogue the southern celestial hemisphere, was admitted as a fellow of the Royal Society on 7 November 1734 thanks to lobbying by Halley.

Although the historical record is unclear on when MacFarlane acquired Campbell's astronomical equipment, by 1743 he had purchased his entire collection. MacFarlane oversaw the construction of a new observatory in Kingston, where the newly-purchased astronomical equipment was installed in. The observatory was an "imposing" Georgian-style building with a flat roof and topped with a hand rail. MacFarlane had a four-foot mural arch erected on a wall, with a five-foot transit instrument, one-month regulator clock and five-foot zenith sector installed elsewhere in the observatory. Finding the zenith sector cumbersome to use, MacFarlane designed a horizontal reflecting sector and in 1755 commissioned the Swiss instrument maker Pierre Martel, who maintained his equipment, to build it.

In November 1743, MacFarlane sent a letter detailing his astronomical observations to James Short, a Scottish telescope maker. Short subsequently travelled to London and read the letter to his fellow members at the Royal Society, nominating MacFarlane for fellowship alongside the English legal scholar James Burrow on 20 November 1746. Although his scientific contributions were "fairly minimal in modern terms", MacFarlane was elected as a fellow of the Royal Society on 19 February 1747. He continued to send astronomical reports to the society, including MacFarlane's observations of lunar eclipses and the transit of Mercury, until his death on 23 August 1755. At the time of his death, MacFarlane owned a large estate, which included 791 enslaved people across six sugar plantations.

== Legacy ==
After his death, MacFarlane's observatory in Kingston was eventually converted by the British colonial authorities in Jamaica into the Surrey County jail after the county was established in 1758. His will and testament was written on 23 August 1755 and entered into the legal record on 9 September. As he never married, the majority of MacFarlane's estate was left in the will to his two brothers, Walter and William, including the sugar plantations "Serge Island", "Biscany", "Bog Pen", "Glen Goff", "Lennox Castle" and "Windsor". MacFarlane also gave varying amounts of money to his relatives in Great Britain and appointed the peer John Arbuthnot, 5th Viscount of Arbuthnott as the chief executor of the will. The will also stated that the following items would be donated to the University of Glasgow:

all my mathematickal instruments: a foor foot Moor alarch [sic] made of brass, a five foot meridian transit, a five foot astronomical sector, a small clock and an instrument of foour foot equal altitude and likewise object, and other globes for three telescopes and three micrometers, also some variation needles and some other small things.

The equipment was transported from Jamaica to Scotland on board the British merchantman Casar, and the university took possession of them on 29 October 1756. As they had been damaged during the voyage due to being thrown around in hold of Casar, university officials contracted the Scottish mechanical engineer James Watt to repair the equipment, paying him £5 for his services; Watt had studied in London, and upon his return to Glasgow served as an instrument maker for the university. In the next year, the university established an observatory using MacFarlane's instruments, with university professors and local magistrates laying the foundation stone on 17 August 1757. Named Macfarlane Observatory in his honour, it was the first such observatory of its type in Britain.

In the 21st century, MacFarlane's ownership of slaves has come under greater scrutiny. The University of Glasgow published a report titled "Slavery, Abolition and The University of Glasgow" in 2018, which had been created by the university's "History of Slavery Steering Committee" as part of a "programme of education and reparative justice." In the report, which detailed Glasgow University's relationship with slavery, race and abolitionism, the academics Stephen Mullen and Simon Newman noted that MacFarlane's bequest, which they described as "very significant", "helped facilitate the founding of the Regius Professor of Astronomy in 1760". In 2019, the University of Glasgow announced that it would raise and spend £20m as slavery reparations, the first UK institution to do so.
