= Ninian Smart =

Scottish scholar of religions (1927–2001)

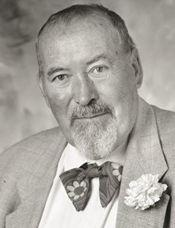
Ninian Smart

Roderick Ninian Smart (6 May 1927 – 29 January 2001) was a Scottish writer and university educator. He was a pioneer in the field of secular religious studies. He is best known for his seven-dimensional definition of religion.

In 1967 he established the first department of religious studies in the United Kingdom at the new University of Lancaster where he was also Pro-Vice-Chancellor, having already chaired one of the largest and most prestigious departments of theology in Britain at the University of Birmingham. In 1976, he became the first J.F. Rowny Professor in the Comparative Study of Religions at University of California, Santa Barbara. Smart presented the Gifford Lectures in 1979–80. In 1996, he was named the Academic Senate's research professor, the highest professorial rank at UC Santa Barbara. In 2000, he was elected president of the American Academy of Religion, while simultaneously retaining his status as president of the Inter Religious Federation for World Peace. Smart held both titles at the time of his death.

Smart became widely known outside the academy, at least in Britain, when he was editorial consultant for the major BBC television series, The Long Search (1977). His book The World's Religions (1989) also reached a considerable popular readership. His defence of religious studies as a secular discipline helped the formation of departments in many public universities, especially in the United States. He distanced religious studies from traditional theology in that evaluating truth claims and apology have no role but regarded investigation into the "truth and worth" of religion per se as a valid academic enterprise in the public arena of state-funded education.

== Early life ==
Ninian Smart was born in Cambridge, England, where his father, William Marshall Smart (1889–1975) was the John Couch Adams Astronomer in the University of Cambridge. His mother was Isabel (née Carswell). W. M Smart, who died in 1975, also served as president of the Royal Astronomical Society (1950). Both parents were Scottish. They moved to Glasgow in 1937, when W. M. Smart became Regius Professor of Astronomy (retiring in 1959).

Smart was one of three brothers, all of whom became professors: Jack (1920–2012) became a professor of philosophy; Alastair (1922–1992) was Professor of Art History at the University of Nottingham.

Smart attended The Glasgow Academy before joining the military in 1945, serving until 1948, in the British Army Intelligence Corps where he learned Chinese (via Confucian texts) mainly at the London School of Oriental and African Studies and had his first extended contact with Sri Lankan Buddhism. It was this experience that roused him from what he called his "Western slumber with the call of diverse and noble cultures." Leaving the army – as a captain – with a scholarship to Queen's College, University of Oxford, he reverted to his Glasgow major, classics and philosophy, mainly because Chinese and Oriental studies in those days had "pathetic curricula". However, for his B.Phil. work he returned to world religions, writing what he later described as "the first dissertation in Oxford on philosophy of religion after World War II".

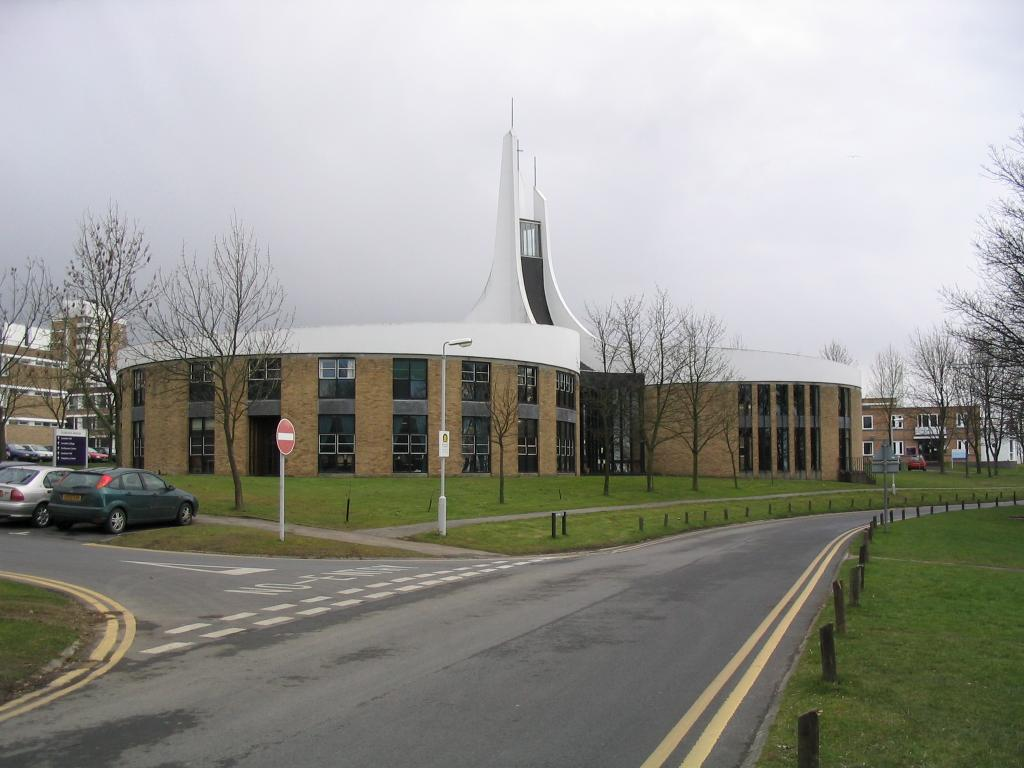
Lancaster University's Chaplaincy Centre

== Career ==
After teaching in the University of Wales from 1952 until 1955, Smart spent a year as a visiting lecturer at Yale University, where he also studied Sanskrit and Pāli, the language of the Buddhist scriptures. In 1956, he was appointed Lecturer in the University of London, then in 1961 at the very young age of 34 – extraordinarily young for a full chair in the British system – he became the first H. G. Wood Professor of Theology at the University of Birmingham – one of the largest departments of theology, where he also served as head of department. By now author of several publications, including Reasons and Faiths (1958), based on his B.Phil. work and World Religions: A Dialogue (1960), Smart was a rising star in the newly developing field of Religious Studies, rather than in Theology, despite the name of the chair he occupied. Already known internationally, he received several offers to take up positions in North America, including as chair of the Columbia and Pennsylvania Departments, and an invitation to apply for a chair at Oxford. However, he was already involved in a consultative capacity in forming the first major department of Religious Studies at the new Lancaster, and found himself "cajoled from being adviser to being candidate" for the chair.

Despite the attraction of prestigious posts elsewhere, he chose Lancaster because it represented a "tabula rasa, a new field" where he could practice his ideas. He took up appointment in 1967, as Foundation Professor of Religious Studies. His tenure at Birmingham University had also done much to shift the department from an exclusive focus on Christianity to encompass world religions. His successor at Birmingham, John Hick, would emerge as the most well-known exponent of a pluralist theology of religions. Between 1969 and 1972, he was also Pro-Vice-Chancellor at Lancaster. In 1977, Smart started to divide his time between Lancaster and another new venture, the Religious studies department at the University of California, Santa Barbara (1976–98) where he became the first J. F. Rowny Professor in the Comparative Study of Religions at Santa Barbara, from 1988 (he was a professor from 1976). As at Birmingham and Lancaster, he was again also department chair. He spent six months of each year at each campus. In 1996, he was named research professor at Santa Barbara, the highest academic honour. Toward the end of his career, he was elected president of the American Academy of Religion. Proud of his Scottish identity, he often wore his kilt on campus at Santa Barbara, where he was renowned for riding his bicycle very slowly, for "his bow ties and the ever-present flower in his lapel, and most of all the twinkle in his eye."

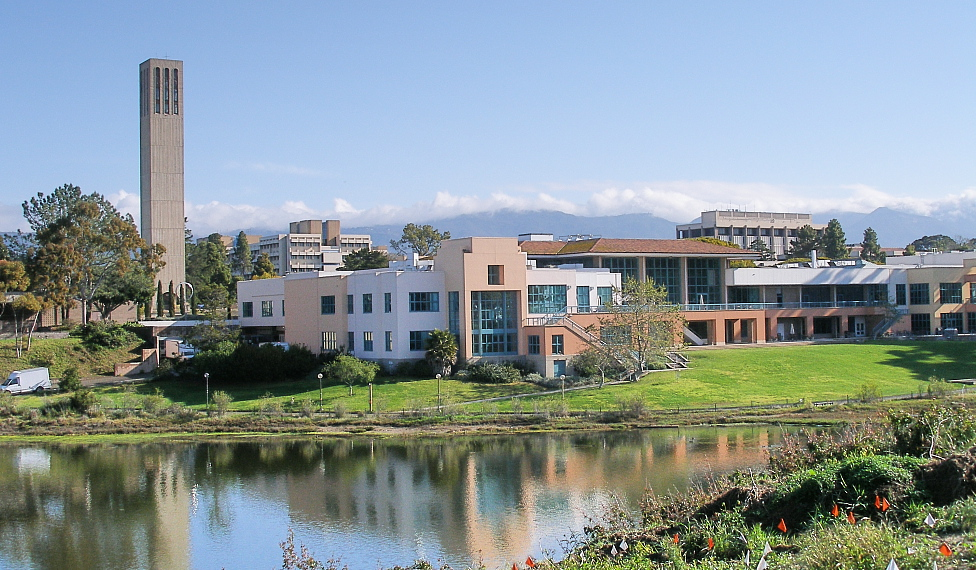
The University of California at Santa Barbara University Center and Lagoon

At Lancaster he was respected by his students for being so accessible, for his willingness to engage his formidable intellect without pretension in informal debate over a pint in the bar.

=== Visiting professorships and lectures ===
Smart was also visiting professor at Varanasi in India, Yale, Wisconsin, Princeton, Queensland, and the respected Religious Studies department at Lampeter, in Hong Kong and elsewhere. Lectures delivered in Delhi were published as The Yogi and the Devotee (1968). In 1967, he presented the Heslington Lectures at the University of York, in which he set out his ideas about secular Religious Studies subsequently published as Secular Education and the Logic of Religion (1967), further developing these in his inaugural lecture at Lancaster, published as Concept and Empathy (1986). In 1979–80, he presented the prestigious Gifford Lectures, published as Beyond Ideology (1981).

=== Activism ===
In addition to teaching, research, and writing, Smart was something of an activist in promoting improved cross-cultural understanding. In the 1970s, he was involved in several initiatives in Britain to broaden the public religious education curriculum, previously purely Christian, to include the range of world religions. He also served on the National Schools Council advising on broadening the religious education curriculum. The teaching of religion in the state school system in the United Kingdom, which is mandatory, distinguishes teaching about religion from faith-nurture, which is not properly part of the task. Smart was involved in the Assembly of the World's Religions series of meetings (1985, 1990, 1992) sponsored by Sun Myung Moon, founder of the Unification movement and served as president of the Inter Religious Federation for World Peace. In 1999, he was co-convener of the First Assembly of the Inter-religious and International Federation for World Peace, established by Moon. Smart reiterated his conviction that without improved understanding of the religious and cultural Other, peace in the world would remain elusive. His concept of religions as worldviews, and his value-free approach to religious studies – that is, refraining from elevating a single understanding of "truth" as some sort of evaluative criterion of religious authenticity-opened up for him the study of non-religious ideologies or worldviews (he preferred this term because it does not imply that theism is an essential element) as well as of new religious movements, which he saw as one result of globalisation. He also wrote the foreword for the Unification publication, World Scripture, edited by Andrew Wilson, in which he stated that, "it is obvious that as we move toward a world civilization, in which so many cultures and spiritual traditions will impinge on one another, all of us should understand one another." Smart was also a member of the International Board of the Global Ethics and Religion Forum, an educational, non-profit NGO dedicated to increasing global ethical responsibility.

=== Academic honours ===
Smart received honorary doctorates from Loyola (1970), University of Glasgow (1984), Stirling University (1986) University of Kelaniya, Sri Lanka (1991), and Lancaster (1995) as well as an Honorary Fellowship from the Queen's College, Oxford (1999). He was made a Life Member of the International Association for the History of Religion (1995).

In 1994, the volume Aspects of Religion, edited by Peter Masefield and Donald Wiebe, was published in his honour.

=== Retirement and death ===
Smart officially retired from Lancaster in 1982 (he was Honorary Professor from 1982 to 1989, then professor emeritus) and from Santa Barbara in 1998, but remained active as a professor emeritus in both universities, living mainly in Lancaster, where he died in 2001 from a massive stroke, aged 73.

== Scholarly contribution ==
Smart is mainly noted for his contribution in the area of methodology, although he saw his contribution as conceptual as well as methodological, commenting that while expertise in languages was not to be dismissed, it should not be "rated above conceptual insight." Secular Religious Studies dates from the mid-1960s, when new departments were established, several in state universities in the United States. At the time, it was only just beginning to earn academic recognition and Smart was a pivotal figure in this process and, as Cunningham comments, "it is difficult now to recall that the emergence of Religious Studies as a higher-education subject was then controversial."

Smart's early work involved linguistic analysis, in which he had experience in, from Oxford. Later, he said that this came close to "cross-cultural study" but had stopped short, since he was still too captive to "our language" and "various assumptions of our culture". However, when he came to publish this he included later conceptual ideas, expanding his dissertation. Interested in Rudolf Otto's concept of the Holy as a key to understanding religion, he found this too restrictive, since Buddhism is non-theistic. Instead, he suggested that religious experience can be either numinous or mystical. He was also influenced by R.C. Zaehner's interest in mysticism, having consulted him at Oxford. He then examined what he took as key religious concepts, such as revelation, faith, conversion and knowledge and analysed what these meant in Christianity, Hinduism, and Buddhism without evaluating any belief in terms of truth or falsity. He was consciously attempting to break out of captivity to Western modes of thought so that for example theism is not taken as an essential component of religion, thus such ideas as theophany or a single ultimate focus or sacrifice do not necessarily translate from the Christian into other religious contexts. "She who knows but one religion knows none," said Smart. Western concern for doctrine overlooked the importance of religious experience. Early in his career, he insisted that an ideology such as Marxism as well as nationalism and rationalism could be considered religious, because they resemble religious traditions in how they function, and therefore properly belong to Religious Studies, the subject matter of which was "non-finite".

He situated Religious Studies in contrast to theology as agnostic on the truth of religious claims but he was critical of Peter Berger for "assuming the non-existence of God". Religious Studies is, however, interested in why people believe that their religious statements or experience is true, thus description, although vital, must "transcend the informative" and engage in dialogue with "the para-historical claims of religions and anti-religious outlooks". It need not be hostile to the type of committed approach pursued in theology "provided it is open, and does not artificially restrict understanding and choice". It is not concerned with evangelising but with elucidating understanding, or meaning. Religious Studies, too, has a vital role to play in combating tribalism, that is, human captivity to its own cultures. Religious Studies as a non-confessional, methodologically agnostic discipline takes its place in the secular academy, where it draw heavily on anthropology, sociology, psychology, history, archaeology, and other disciplines. At bottom, it has a place in the public or state sector because, as an aspect of human experience, it is also the study of people – of what they believe, why they believe and act as they do, both individually and within society. It is a constantly changing field because religions change as religious people adapt to new circumstances. Religious Studies is never exclusively interested in what might be termed orthodoxy—however a religion itself might enforce or police conformity to an official version – but with religion as it is lived, with "religion on the ground," a term he first used in 1978. Responses to modernity, to globalisation, as well as trends towards religious eclecticism, properly concern Religious Studies. Smart did not anticipate a single, eclectic religion emerging but that religions would increasingly borrow from one another and that a global consensus on the value of religion in society would evolve. In interview with Scott London, he said:

I … believe we are moving toward a global ideology that has a place for religion and recognizes the contributions of the different traditions. Hopefully, it will have an overarching view as to how we can work together for the promotion of human values and spirituality.

=== Dimensions of religion ===
Smart is widely known for his seven-part definition of religion, or rather scheme of study; as this approach avoids the problem of defining altogether. Whatever else religion may or may not be – whether theistic or non-theistic, religions possess certain recognisable elements, which can be studied. These dimensions vary in importance but are almost always present. Smart divided these into "historical" and "para-historical," meaning by the latter those dimensions that take the investigation into the experience, or inner lives, or religious people. The "historical" can be studied empirically, but the para-historical takes the student into the realm of belief and concepts and requires dialogue and participation. "... since the study of man is in an important sense participatory – for one has to enter into men's intentions, beliefs, myths, desires, in order to understand why they act as they do – it is fatal if cultures including our own are described merely externally, without entering into dialogue with them".

Smart's sevenfold scheme of study:

1. Doctrinal
2. Mythological
3. Ethical
4. Ritual
5. Experiential
6. Institutional
7. Material (added in his 1989 text, The World's Religions)

Note: Smart categorised 1–3 as para-historical and 4–6 as historical.

== Legacy ==
Smart's contribution to Religious Studies continues to influence curricula, syllabi and methodology. In particular, his "dimensions of religion," a framework for comparing religions, has been influential within the academy. His willingness to take seriously what others saw as "illegitimate," such as ideologies and new religious movements, did much to allow Religious Studies to distinguish itself from theology and from any charge of privileging any particular faith or version of a faith. Hecht commented that, "When the definitive history of the study of religion in the 20th century is written..." Ninian Smart "will certainly be seen as a giant among his peers" since Smart's "many books opened religion to scholar and layperson alike". The Ninian Smart Annual Memorial Lecture, created in his honour, alternates between Lancaster and Santa Barbara. At Loyola, he is honoured by the Ninian Smart Award for Excellence in Religious Studies. In April 2001, the Santa Barbara Templeton Research Lecture series was dedicated to the memory of Smart, and a commemorative plaque was presented to the Smart family. He had been due to deliver a Templeton lecture himself.

== Personal life ==
Smart married Libushka Baruffaldi in 1954. Their children were Roderick, Luisabel, Caroline and Peregrine. Smart had eight grandchildren at the time of his death, followed by his ninth shortly after.

Libushka was originally from Lake Como, Italy, where Smart regularly spent his summer vacations at his family home. Ninian and Libushka were the first from the Western academy to have their marriage blessed by Sun Myung Moon and his wife Hak Ja Han in August 1992.

Towards the end of his life, Smart described himself as a "Buddhist-Episcopalian", saying, "No religion, it seems to me, contains the whole truth. I think it's mad to think that there is nothing to learn from other traditions and civilizations. If you accept that other religions have something to offer and you learn from them, that is what you become: a Buddhist-Episcopalian or a Hindu-Muslim or whatever".

== Selected writings ==
- Reasons and Faiths: An Investigation of Religious Discourse, Christian and non-Christian. London: Routledge, 1958. ISBN 0-415-22564-7
- World Religions: A Dialogue. Baltimore: Penguin, 1960.
- Historical Selections in the Philosophy of Religion. NY: Harper & Row, 1962.
- Doctrine and Argument in Indian Philosophy. London: Allen & Unwin, 1964 (2nd edn. Brill, 1997).
- Secular Education and the Logic of Religion. NY: Humanities Press, 1968.
- The Yogi and the Devotee: The Interplay Between the Upanishads and Catholic Theology. London: Allen & Unwin, 1968.
- The Religious Experience of Mankind. Englewood Cliffs, NJ: Prentice Hall, 1969 (5th edn. 1996). ISBN 0-02-412141-X
- Philosophy of Religion. Oxford: Oxford UP, 1970. ISBN 0-19-520138-8
- Mao. Fontana/Collins, 1974.
- Background to the Long Search. London: BBC, 1977. ISBN 978-0-563-12779-6
- In Search of Christianity. NY: Harper & Row, 1979. ISBN 0-06-067401-6
- The Phenomenon of Christianity. Collins, 1979. ISBN 0-00-215115-4
- Beyond Ideology: Religion and the Future of Western Civilization (Gifford lectures). Harper & Row, 1981. ISBN 0-06-067402-4
- Worldviews: Crosscultural Explorations of Human Belief. Englewood Cliffs, NJ: Prentice Hall, 1981 (3rd edn. Pearson, 1999). ISBN 0-13-020980-5
- (with Swami Purnananda) Prophet of a New Hindu Age: The Life and Times of Acharya Pranavananda. NY: Routledge, 1985.
- Religion and the Western Mind. NY: State University of New York Press, 1987. ISBN 0-88706-383-7
- The World's Religions: Old Traditions and Modern Transformations. Cambridge: Cambridge UP, 1989 (2nd edn. 1998). ISBN 0-521-63748-1
- Religions of Asia. Pearson College Div., 1992.
- (with Steven Konstantine) Changing Worlds: Christian Systematic Theology in a World Context. HarperCollins, 1992.
- Buddhism and Christianity: Rivals and Allies. Honolulu: University of Hawaii Press, 1993. ISBN 0-8248-1520-3
- Religions of the West. Englewood Cliffs, NJ: Prentice Hall, 1993. ISBN 0-13-156811-6
- Choosing a Faith. NY: Marion Boyars Publishers, 1995. ISBN 0-7145-2982-6
- Dimensions of the Sacred: An Anatomy of the World's Beliefs. Berkeley, Cal: University of California Press, 1998. ISBN 0-520-21960-0
- World Philosophies. NY: Routledge, 2000. ISBN 0-415-22852-2

Collected essays

- Concept and Empathy: Essays in the Study of Religion. Edited by Donald Wiebe. New York UP, 1986.
- Reflections in the Mirror of Religion. Edited by John P. Burris. Palgrave Macmillan, 1997.

Poetry

- Smart Verse: The Owl Flies Amid the Wood Wind Hooting. Daniel & Daniel, 1996.

== See also ==
- New religious movement

== Notes ==
=== References ===
- Sharpe, Eric J. (1983). Understanding Religion. New York: St Martin's Press. ISBN 978-0-312-83208-7.
- Smart, Ninian (1968). Secular Education and the Logic of Religion. New York: Humanities Press. ISBN 978-0-571-08284-1.
- Smart, Ninian (2000). "Methods in My Life". In Jon R. Stone (ed.). The Craft of Religious Studies. New York: Palgrave. pp. 18–35. ISBN 0-312-23887-8.
- Smart, Ninian; Masefield, Peter; Wiebe, Donald (1994). Aspects of Religion Essays in Honour of Ninian Smart. New York: P. Lang. ISBN 978-0-8204-2237-4.
- Wilson, Andrew, ed. (1991). World Scripture: a Comparative Anthology of Sacred Texts. St Paul, Minnesota: Paragon House. ISBN 1-55778-723-9.
