= Macfarlane Observatory =

Astronomical observatory at University of Glasgow in 1757

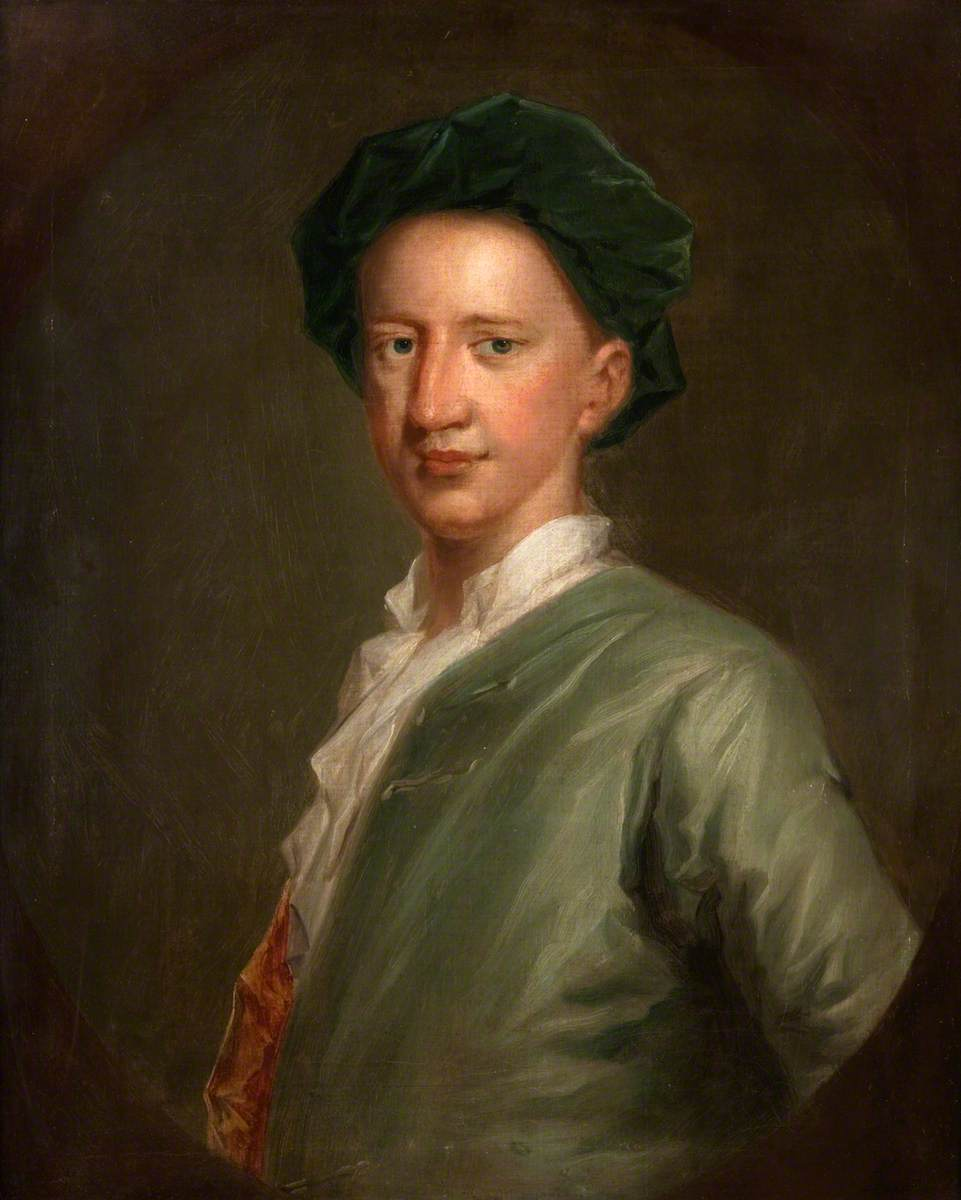
Alexander MacFarlane, whom the observatory was named after

The Macfarlane Observatory was established at the University of Glasgow in 1757. It was the first purpose-built university observatory in Britain.

== History ==
The Observatory was named after Alexander MacFarlane, a slaveholding Scottish merchant and astronomer who resided in Kingston, Jamaica and bequeathed his astronomical instruments to the University of Glasgow after his death in October 1755. Macfarlane graduated with an MA from the university in 1728.

He emigrated to Jamaica in 1735. He later became assistant judge and member of the Legislative Assembly of Jamaica. Macfarlane purchased the astronomical instruments of Colin Campbell after 1742.

The instruments arrived to Glasgow in a deteriorated condition, and their suitability for mounting was in question before they were taken in hand by James Watt in 1756. Watt trained in London and upon returning to Glasgow served as instrument maker to the university. He was commissioned to repair the instruments, and he was paid £5 for his services.

The donation was opportune for Watt as well as the University. As Marshall writes:

...within a month of [Watt’s] arrival in Glasgow, the University received a case of astronomical instruments...the sea voyage had thrown these delicate instruments out of gear, and they needed overhauling by an expert....

The foundation stone for the observatory was laid in 1757. It was located between Gallowgate and Duke Street. In 1760 Alexander Wilson was installed as professor of practical astronomy. His interest in sun spots made the Observatory an early contributor to solar physics as Wilson described the surface of the Sun. Observing the variation in width of the penumbra of a sunspot near the limb, he concluded the sunspots were depressions in the generally spherical photosphere. The phenomenon is called the Wilson effect to acknowledge his early observations.

In the eighteenth century, the social position of an observatory was greater than now: as Dava Sobel writes, "...The founding philosophy of the Royal Observatory, like that of the Paris Observatory before it, viewed astronomy as a means to an end. All the far-flung stars must be catalogued, so as to chart a course for sailors over the oceans of the earth." An observatory represented a place of certitude of time and place, a place to set a marine chronometer for use at sea, where longitude was found by the method of lunar distances. The establishment of the Macfarlane Observatory in 1757 was before the 1767 appearance of The Nautical Almanac based on the Prime Meridian at Royal Observatory, Greenwich.

== Legacy ==
A portrait and biographical note about Alexander MacFarlane appear on the University's website.

In September 2018, the University published a report titled "Slavery, Abolition and The University of Glasgow" in its efforts towards a "programme of reparatory justice". It outlines significant gifts received by the University from people that derived wealth from slavery, which includes an acknowledgement of the value and intellectual capital of the instruments donated by Alexander Macfarlane.
