= Wilson Greek =

Wilson Greek is a polytonic Greek typeface designed in 1995 by Matthew Carter, notable for its large inventory of ligatures. It is based on a typeface designed in 1756 by Alexander Wilson for an edition of Homer's Iliad and Odyssey published that same year in Glasgow by Robert and Andrew Foulis.

Wilson's typeface was innovative in its rejection of the normative Greek typeface design of the time, which was heavily influenced by Claude Garamond's Grecs du roi (1541).
