= Ralph Elmer Wilson =

American astronomer (1886–1960)

- Born: April 14, 1886; Cincinnati, Ohio, US
- Died: March 25, 1960 (aged 73); Corona del Mar, California, US
- Education: University of Virginia
- Known for: Astrometric studies, editor
- Spouse: Mary Adelaide Macdonald
- Children: Herbert Ralph Wilson
- Awards: Gold Medal of the Royal Danish Academy of Sciences (1926)
- Scientific career
- Fields: Astronomy
- Thesis: New Positions of the Stars in the Huyghenian Region of the Great Nebula of Orion (1910)
- Doctoral advisor: Ormond Stone

Ralph Elmer Wilson (April 14, 1886 – March 25, 1960) was an American astronomer.

Wilson was born in Cincinnati, Ohio, the son of Herbert Couper Wilson and Mary B. Nichols. He earned his B.A. from Carleton College and entered the University of Virginia in 1906, where he earned his Ph.D. in 1910 based on his work at the Leander Mccormick Observatory working with Ormond Stone. He then worked at the Dudley Observatory, then at the Lick southern station in Santiago, Chile in 1913, and by 1939 at the Mount Wilson Observatory. In 1929, he became the associate editor of the Astronomical Journal. He was elected to the National Academy of Sciences in 1950.

He published multiple papers on stellar absolute magnitudes, proper motions, and radial velocities of various stars, along with binary star systems and orbital derivations of spectroscopic binaries. Among his publications was the General Catalogue of Stellar Radial Velocities in 1953.

The crater Wilson on the Moon is co-named for him, Alexander Wilson and Charles T. R. Wilson.
