= Hydrostatic bubbles =

Type of hydrometer used in the 18th and 19th centuries

Hydrostatic bubbles, also known as philosophical bubbles, gravity beads, aerometrical beads and hydrometer beads, are a type of hydrometer invented in 1757 by Alexander Wilson of Glasgow. The design was subsequently improved and patented by the glassblower and instrument maker Isabella Lovi of Edinburgh in 1805. The instrument, which consists of a set of glass beads, seems to have been particular to Scotland and was only used (for example, in determining the density of spirits) until the early 19th century, when it was largely superseded by more accurate methods.

== Operating principle ==
In Lovi's version of the instrument, a set of hollow glass beads was created, each differing in density from the next by 0.002 units. When added to a liquid of unknown density, the beads that were more dense than the liquid sank, and those that were less dense than the liquid floated. The density of the liquid was indicated as falling between the density of the least dense bead that sank, and the most dense bead that floated.

The operating principle is similar to that of the Galilean thermometer.
