= C. T. R. Wilson =

British meteorologist and physicist (1869–1959)

Charles Wilson CH FRS FRSE
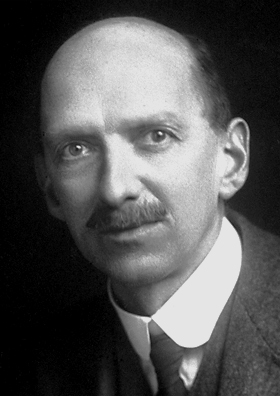
- Wilson in 1927
- Born: Charles Thomson Rees Wilson; 14 February 1869; Glencorse, Scotland
- Died: 15 November 1959 (aged 90); Carlops, Scotland
- Education: Owens College (BSc); University of Cambridge (BA, MA)
- Known for: Invention of the cloud chamber
- Spouse: Jessie Fraser (m. 1908)
- Children: 4
- Awards: Hughes Medal (1911); Royal Medal (1922); Howard N. Potts Medal (1925); Nobel Prize in Physics (1927); Franklin Medal (1929); Duddell Medal and Prize (1931); Copley Medal (1935)
- Scientific career
- Fields: Meteorology; Physics
- Workplaces: University of Cambridge
- Academic advisors: J. J. Thomson
- Doctoral students: C. F. Powell
- Other notable students: D. M. Bose; Philip Dee; P. C. Mahalanobis

Charles Thomson Rees Wilson (14 February 1869 – 15 November 1959) was a Scottish meteorologist and physicist who shared the 1927 Nobel Prize in Physics with Arthur Compton for his invention of the cloud chamber.

== Early life and education ==
Charles Thomson Rees Wilson was born on 14 February 1869 in Glencorse, Scotland, the son of Annie Clark (née Harper) and John Wilson, a sheep farmer. After his father died in 1873, Wilson moved with his family to Manchester, England.

With financial support from his step-brother, Wilson studied biology at Owens College (now the University of Manchester) with the intent of becoming a doctor, receiving a Bachelor of Science in 1887. The following year, he won a scholarship to attend Sidney Sussex College, Cambridge, where he became interested in physics and chemistry. In 1892, he graduated with first-class honours in Part II of the Natural Sciences Tripos, and with a Master of Arts in 1897.

== Career and research ==
Wilson became particularly interested in meteorology, and in 1893 he began to study clouds and their properties. Beginning in 1894, he worked for some time at the observatory on Ben Nevis, where he made observations of cloud formation. He was particularly fascinated by the appearance of glories. He then tried to reproduce this effect on a smaller scale in the Cavendish Laboratory at Cambridge, expanding humid air within a sealed container.

In 1895, Wilson discovered that at a large enough expansion ratio, supersaturated water vapour condensates even without dust which he removed by previous condensations, contrary to the previous research by John Aitken. Under J. J. Thomson's mentorship by 1896, he found out that X-rays stimulate the condensation just as well as dust.

In 1900, Wilson became a Fellow of Sidney Sussex College, Cambridge, and was appointed University Lecturer and Demonstrator. He was known by some as a poor lecturer, due to a pronounced stutter. He taught a course on atmospheric electricity as a visiting lecturer at Imperial College London. He was appointed Reader in Electrical Meteorology in 1918 and Jacksonian Professor of Natural Philosophy in 1925.

In 1906, Wilson hypothesised that cosmic radiation generates the ions causing condensation without apparent reasons.

Wilson published numerous papers on meteorology and physics, on topics including X-rays, ionisation, thundercloud formation, and other meteorological events. Wilson may also have observed a sprite in 1924, 65 years before their official discovery. Weather was a focus of his work throughout his career, from his early observations at Ben Nevis to his final paper, on thunderclouds.

== Cloud chamber ==
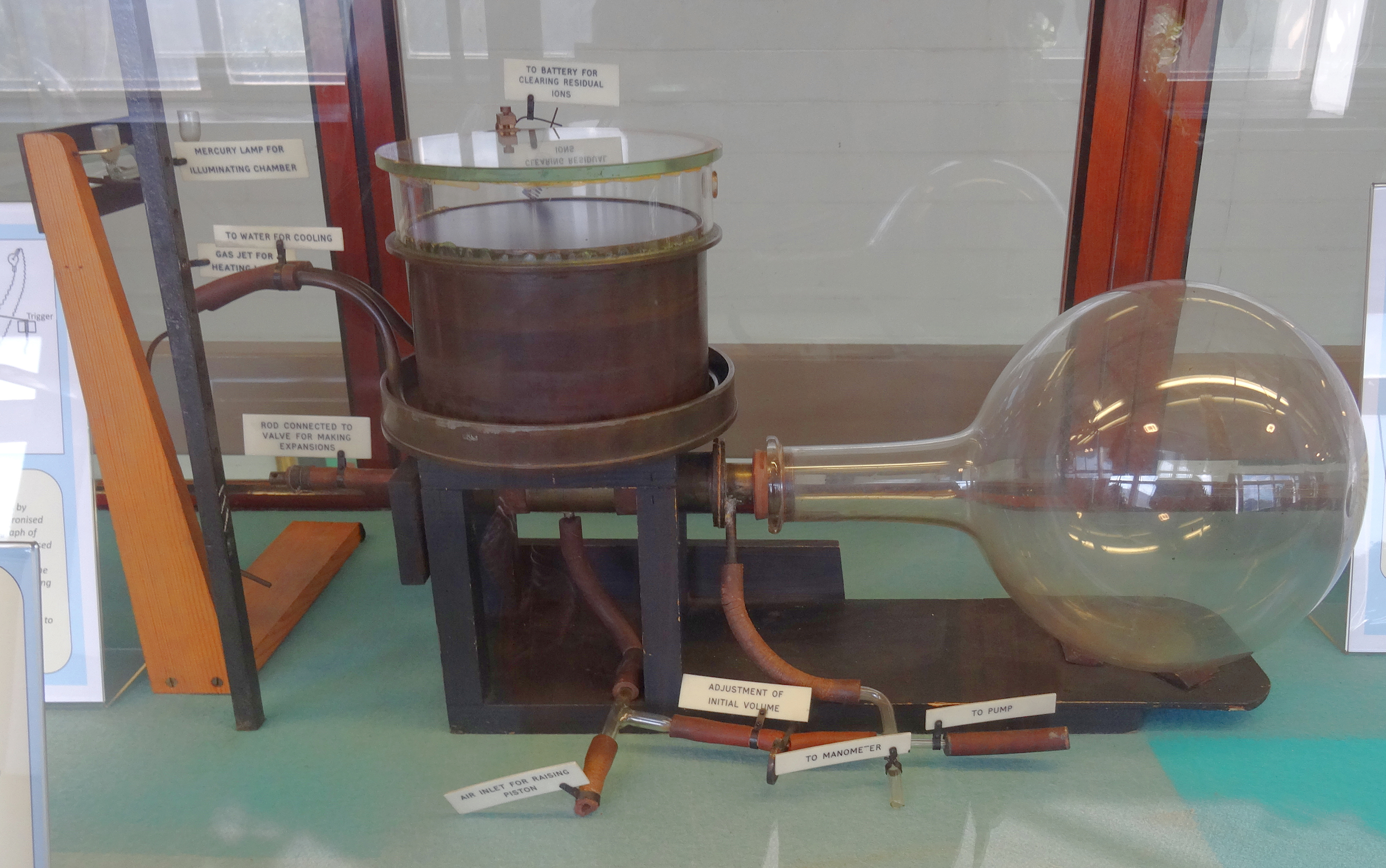
Wilson's original cloud chamber.

The invention of the cloud chamber was by far Wilson's signature accomplishment, earning him the Nobel Prize in Physics in 1927. The Cavendish Laboratory praised him for the creation of "a novel and striking method of investigating the properties of ionised gases." The cloud chamber allowed huge experimental leaps forward in the study of subatomic particles and the field of particle physics, generally. Some have credited Wilson with making the study of particles possible at all.

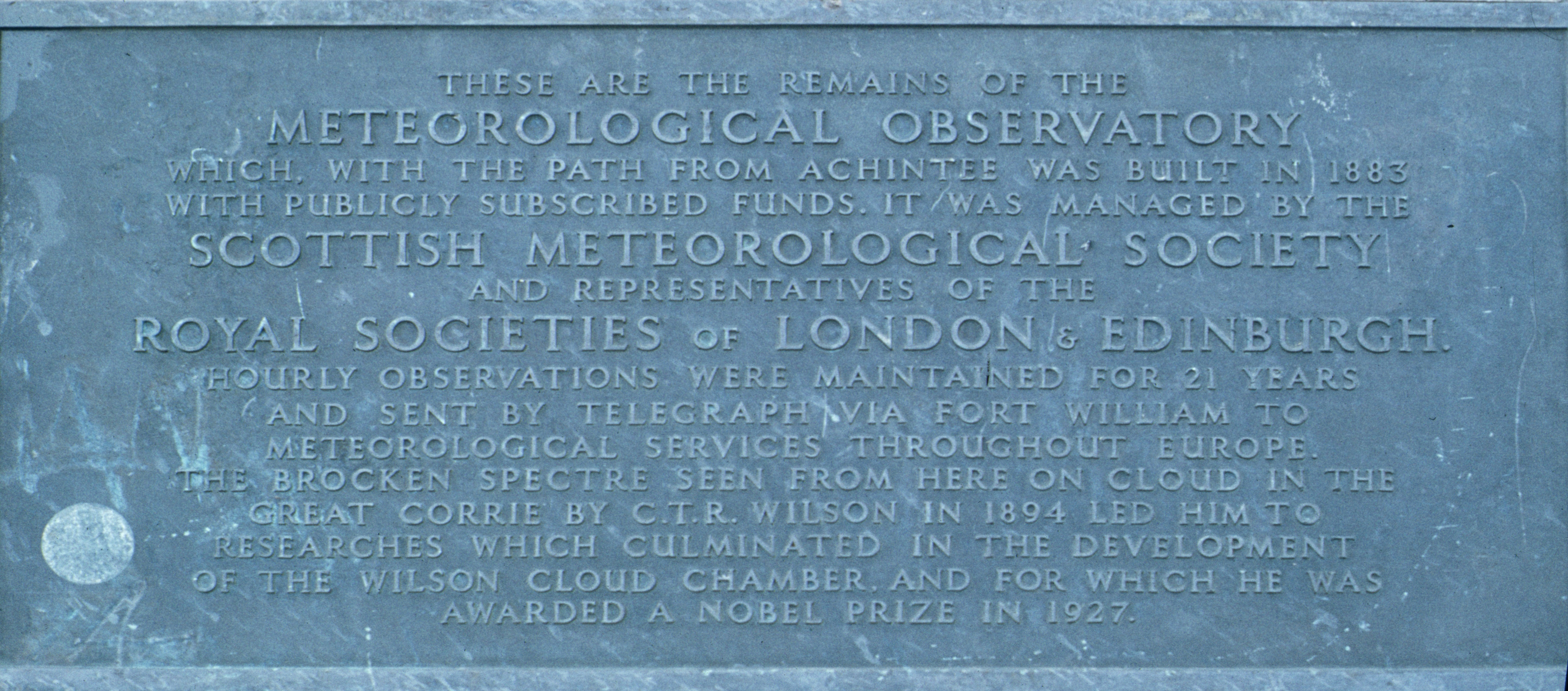
Commemorative plaque at Ben Nevis about the observatory there, and Wilson's cloud chamber.

Wilson later experimented with the creation of cloud trails in his chamber by condensation onto ions generated by radioactivity. Several of his cloud chambers survive.

Retrospectively, Wilson's experimental method has received some attention from scholars.

In a period of scientific inquiry characterised by a divide between "analytical" and "morphological" scientists, Wilson's method of inquiry represented a hybrid. While some scientists believed phenomena should be observed in pure nature, others proposed laboratory-controlled experiments as the premier method for inquiry. Wilson used a combination of methods in his experiments and investigations. Wilson's work "made things visible whose properties had only previously been deduced indirectly."

Wilson has been called "almost the last of the great individual experimenters in physics." He used his cloud chamber in various ways to demonstrate the operating principles of things like subatomic particles and X-rays. But his primary interest, and the subject of the bulk of his papers, was meteorology.

== Personal life and death ==
In 1908, Wilson married Jessie Fraser, the daughter of a minister from Glasgow. They had four children. His family knew him as patient and curious, and fond of taking walks in the hills near his home.

Wilson died on 15 November 1959 at his home in Carlops at the age of 90, surrounded by his family.

== Recognition ==
=== Memberships ===
Year	Organisation	Type	Ref.
1900	Royal Society	Fellow	
1902	Royal Society of Edinburgh	Fellow	

=== Awards ===
Year	Organisation	Award	Citation	Ref.
1911	Royal Society	Hughes Medal	"For his work on nuclei in dust-free air, and his work on ions in gases and atmospheric electricity."	
1922	Royal Society	Royal Medal	"For his researches on condensation nuclei and atmospheric electricity."	
1925	Franklin Institute	Howard N. Potts Medal	—	
1927	Royal Swedish Academy of Sciences	Nobel Prize in Physics	"For his method of making the paths of electrically charged particles visible by condensation of vapour."	
1929	Franklin Institute	Franklin Medal	—	
1931	Institute of Physics	Duddell Medal and Prize	—	
1935	Royal Society	Copley Medal	"For his work on the use of clouds in advancing our knowledge of atoms and their properties."	

=== Honours ===
Year	Country	Honour	Ref.
1937	United Kingdom	Order of the Companions of Honour	

== Commemoration ==
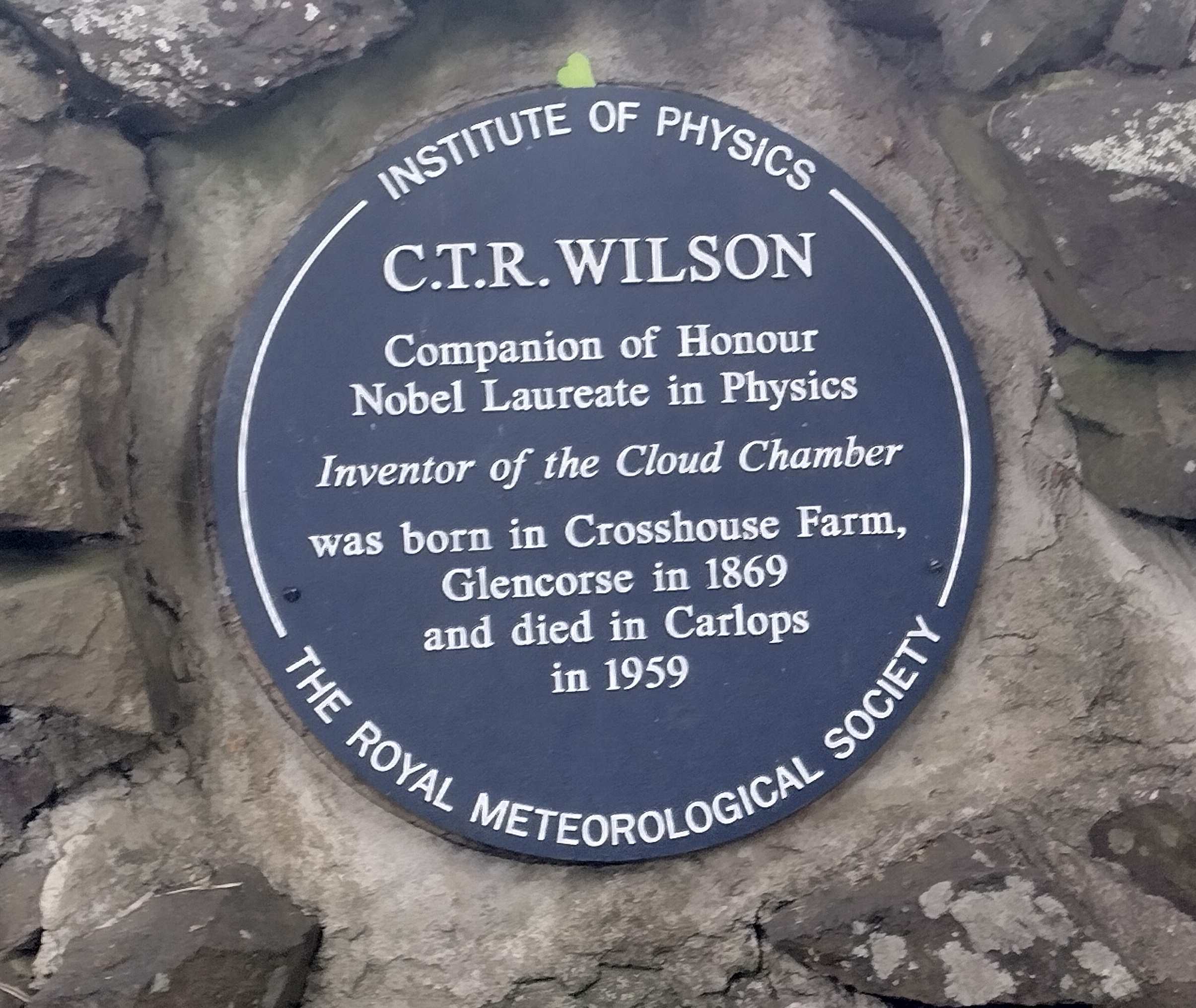
Commemorative plaque at Flotterstone

Wilson crater on the Moon is named after him, Alexander Wilson, and Ralph Elmer Wilson. The Wilson Condensation Cloud formations that occur after large explosions, such as nuclear detonations, are named after him. The Wilson Society—the scientific society of Sidney Sussex College, Cambridge—is named in his honour, as is the CTR Wilson Institute for Atmospheric Electricity—the Atmospheric Electricity Special Interest Group of the Royal Meteorological Society.

The archives of C.T.R. Wilson are maintained by the Archives of the University of Glasgow.

in 1996, a blue plaque in Wilson's honour was installed in a specially built cairn at Flotterstone, close to his birthplace at Crosshouse Farm.

In 2012, the Royal Society of Edinburgh held a meeting in honour of Wilson, the "Great Scottish Physicist."

Academic offices
Preceded by James Dewar	Jacksonian Professor of Natural Philosophy; 1925–1934	Succeeded by Edward Victor Appleton
