= Alexander Wilson (astronomer) =

Alexander Wilson FRSE
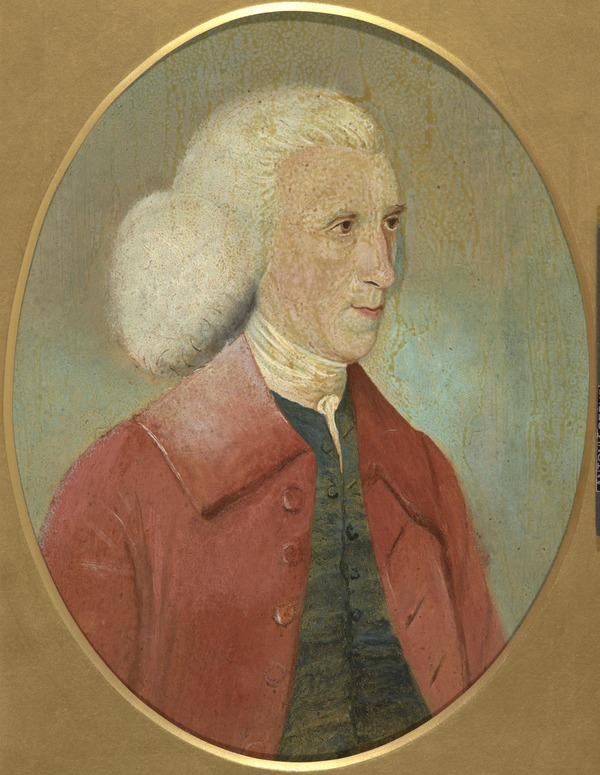
- Portrait of Wilson
- Born: 1714; St Andrews, Scotland
- Died: 16 October 1786 (aged 71–72); Edinburgh, Scotland
- Education: University of St Andrews
- Known for: Wilson effect Wilson Greek
- Scientific career
- Fields: Astronomy; Mathematics; Meteorology; Type-making
- Workplaces: University of Glasgow

Notes
- Member of the Glasgow Literary Society; Member of the Edinburgh Philosophical Society; Founder Fellow of the Royal Society of Edinburgh (1783)

Alexander Wilson FRSE (1714 – 16 October 1786) was a Scottish surgeon, type-founder, astronomer, mathematician and meteorologist. He was the first scientist to use kites in meteorological investigations. He was the first Regius Professor of Practical Astronomy at the University of Glasgow.

== Early life ==
Wilson was born in St Andrews, Fife, the son of Clara Fairfoul and Patrick Wilson, the town clerk of St Andrews. He was educated at the University of St Andrews, graduating in 1733 with an MA.

He was first apprenticed to a physician in St Andrews where he became skilled in constructing mercury thermometers in glass. In 1737, he left for London to make his fortune, He found work as assistant to a French surgeon-apothecary, which included caring for his patients. During this time he was introduced to Lord Isla who like Wilson was interested in astronomy, and Wilson constructed instruments for Isla during 1738.

After visiting a type foundry with a friend in London, he had an idea for making better typefaces. He and his friend John Baine returned to St Andrews in 1739, where they started a type foundry business in 1742. For example, in 1756 Wilson Greek typefaces were used to print classics of Greek literature.

== University of Glasgow ==
In 1744, his type foundry moved to Camlachie, near Glasgow and in 1748 he was appointed type-founder to the University of Glasgow. In the following year the partnership with Baine was dissolved. Later his sons became partners. He supplied types to the Foulis press making possible beautiful and artistic publications. Among modern typefaces, Fontana, Scotch Roman, and Wilson Greek are based on types cut by Wilson.

In 1749, Wilson made the first recorded use of kites in meteorology with his lodger, a 23-year-old University of Glasgow student Thomas Melvill. They simultaneously measured air temperature at various levels above the ground with a train of kites. Melvill went on to discover sodium light.

In 1757, Wilson invented hydrostatic bubbles, a form of hydrometer.

In 1760, with the support of his friend Lord Isla, the 3rd Duke of Argyle, Wilson was appointed to the new chair of practical astronomy at the University of Glasgow, as the University has recently completed the Macfarlane Observatory. Wilson primarily made contributions to astronomy and meteorology, and posited that "what hinders the fixed stars from falling upon one another", the question that Newton had posed in his Opticks (1704), was that the entire universe rotated around its centre.

Wilson noted that sunspots viewed near the edge of the Sun's visible disk appear depressed below the solar surface, a phenomenon referred to as the Wilson effect. When the Royal Danish Academy of Sciences and Letters announced a prize to be awarded for the best essay on the nature of solar spots, Wilson submitted an entry. On 18 February 1772 the Academy presented Wilson with a gold medal for his work on sunspots.

The crater Wilson on the Moon is named for him, Ralph Elmer Wilson and C. T. R. Wilson.

He, and his second son Patrick Wilson, were two of the founding members of the Royal Society of Edinburgh (RSE). Patrick wrote a biographical article of his father which was published both in the Transactions of the RSE and Edinburgh Journal of Science.

In 1783 he was a joint founder of the Royal Society of Edinburgh. He died in Edinburgh on 16 October 1786.

== Personal life ==
In 1740 Wilson married Jean, the daughter of William Sharp, a merchant in St Andrews. Together they had at least three sons. He married for a second time in 1752.

Academic offices
Preceded by None: new position	Regius Professor of Practical Astronomy at Glasgow University; 1760–1784	Succeeded by Patrick Wilson
