= James Couper (astronomer) =

Scottish astronomer (1752–1836)

- Born: 9 August 1752
- Died: 7 January 1836 (aged 83)
- Education: Glasgow University
- Spouse: Margaret Thomson (after 1783)
- Scientific career
- Fields: Astronomy; Divinity
- Workplaces: Glasgow —University

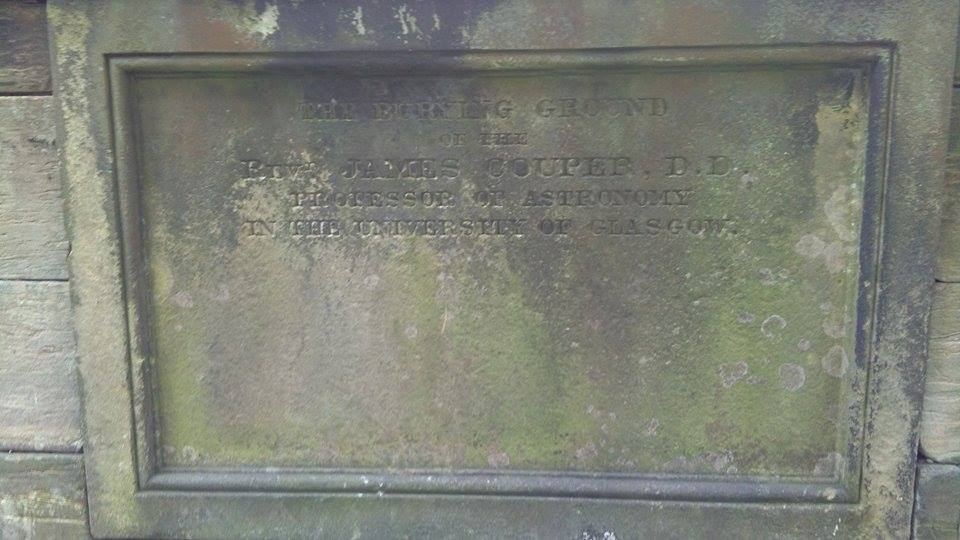
The grave of James Couper, Ramshorn Cemetery, Glasgow

James Couper (9 August 1752 – 7 August 1836) was a Scottish astronomer. He was Professor of Astronomy at the University of Glasgow from 1803 to 1836.

== Life ==
Couper was a Professor of Astronomy at the University of Glasgow from 1803 to 1836. He also held other positions within the university including:

- Dean of Faculties 1800–1801
- Clerk of Senate from 1810 to 1814, 1820 to 1828
- keeper of the Hunterian Museum (a joint position with his sons)

He taught very little Astronomy and abandoned observations because of the increasing smoke and new buildings in the surrounding areas of the observatory. He seemed not to have considered building a new observatory outside the town.

Couper was a student at the University of Glasgow and graduated Master of Arts in 1775, and a Doctor of Divinity in 1800. He became minister of Baldernock Parish Church in 1783 until his appointment to the Regius Chair of Astronomy in 1803. In November 1813 Couper took on responsibility for teaching Hebrew when the then Professor of Oriental Languages became ill.

He is buried in Ramshorn Cemetery on Ingram Street in Glasgow. The grave lies on the western wall of the main eastern entrance, close to where the cemetery widens.

== Minister ==
Couper became minister of Baldernock Parish Church, East Renfrewshire, in 1783. In 1795, the present Church building was constructed during his tenure. Couper wrote in his first Statistical Account; "The greater part of the inhabitants of this parish devote their time to that most innocent and most useful of secular employments, the cultivation of the earth".

The "living" received by Couper in 1783 consisted of "63 bolls of the meal, £331 in money. a manse and a Glebe of 10 acres whereof seven are arable".

== Family ==
James Couper married Margaret Thomson on 11 November 1783. They had seven children;

- John Couper, b. 16 January 1785, d.(date unknown)
- Rev. James Couper, MA, b. 17 August 1786, d. 29 March 1822
- Sarah Couper, b. 5 April 1788, d.(date unknown)
- Robert Thomson Couper, b. 6 January 1790, d. 4 February 1803
- William Couper, MD, b. 30 April 1792, d. 4 August 1857
- Henry Glassford Couper, b. 20 May 1793, d. 27 October 1800
- Henry Couper, b. 20 September 1801, d.(date unknown)

Academic offices
| Preceded by William Meikleham | Regius Professor of Practical Astronomy at Glasgow University; 1803–1836 | Succeeded by John Nichol |
