= William Marshall Smart =

Scottish astronomer

William Marshall Smart FRSE PRAS LLD RIN (9 March 1889, Doune, Perthshire – 17 September 1975, Lancaster) was a 20th-century Scottish astronomer.

== Life ==
He was born in Doune in Stirlingshire the son of Peter Fernie Smart and his wife, Isabella Marshall Harrower. He was educated at the McLaren High School, in Callander, and graduated MA from the University of Glasgow in 1910 in mathematics and natural philosophy. He went on to graduate with a triple first in the Mathematical Triposes at Trinity College, Cambridge, where he won the Tyson Medal for astronomy.

He served in the Royal Navy during World War I as an instructor in navigation (RN College Greenwich 1915, HMS Emperor of India 1916–19) and then returned to Cambridge University in 1919 as a lecturer in mathematics and was appointed John Couch Adams Astronomer. With Commander FN Shearme, he wrote the Admiralty Manual of Navigation (1922). From 1937 to 1959 he was Regius Professor of Astronomy at the University of Glasgow. The first edition of his Text-Book on Spherical Astronomy (later co-authored) appeared in 1931.

During World War II, Smart published four volumes on sea and air navigation that became training manuals in the armed forces. He wrote more than twenty academic books during his career and he was recognised as a leader in his field.

In 1943 he was elected a fellow of the Royal Society of Edinburgh. His proposers were Edward Hindle, William Michael Herbert Greaves, Edwin Arthur Baker and James Pickering Kendall. He served as the society's vice president from 1952 to 1955.

In 1944 he moved to the university property: 2 The Square in Glasgow, previously the house of Prof Duncan M. Blair.

He was president of the Royal Astronomical Society from 1949 to 1951, and was a member of the Royal Institute of Navigation.

He was awarded the Lorimer Medal of the Astronomical Society of Edinburgh in 1958.

== Family ==
He was married to Isabel Carswell.

Their children included Professor Ninian Smart and the utilitarian philosopher, Professor John Jamieson Carswell "Jack" Smart, (often known as J.J.C Smart).

== Published books ==
- The Sun, the Stars and the Universe (1928)
- Astrophysics: the characteristics and evolution of the stars (1928)
- Textbook on Spherical Astronomy (1931)
- Stellar Motions (1932)
- Astronomy (1937)
- Stellar dynamics (1938)
- Foundations of Astronomy (1942)
- Introduction to sea & air navigation... (1942)
- Astronomical Navigation: A Handbook for Aviators (1944)
- Some famous stars (1950)
- Celestial Mechanics (1953)
- Foundations of Analytical Geometry (1956)
- Combination of Observations (1958)
- The Origin of the Earth (1959)
- Stellar kinematics (1968)
- The riddle of the universe (1970)

Academic offices
Preceded by Ludwig Becker	Regius Professor of Practical Astronomy at the University of Glasgow; 1937–1959	Succeeded by Peter Allan Sweet
