= Andrew Wilson (academic) =

American religious academic

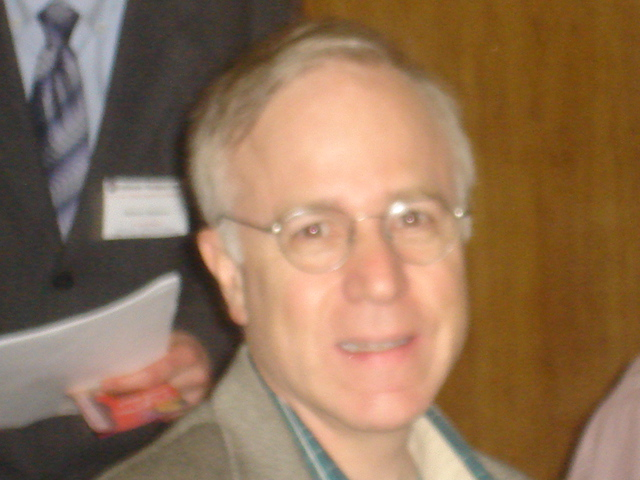
- Dr. Wilson at an academic gathering
- Born: 26 December 1950 (age 75); Syracuse, New York
- Education: Harvard University
- Occupations: Professor, Academic Dean
- Employer: Unification Theological Seminary
- Known for: Unification Church theologian, author, educator

Andrew Wilson (born December 26, 1950) is the director of scriptural research and professor of scriptural studies of the Unification Theological Seminary (UTS), the main seminary of the international Unification Church.

== World Scripture and its reception ==
Wilson edited World Scripture: A Comparative Anthology of Sacred Texts (published 1991), a comparative anthology that contains over 4,000 scriptural passages from 268 sacred texts and 55 oral traditions. Gifford Lecturer Ninian Smart wrote the book's foreword. Its publisher quotes include praise for its contribution to comparative religion from clergy, scholars, and practitioners of multiple faith traditions, and it has been briefly and favorably mentioned in multiple non-UTS publications. Peace studies professor Lester Kurtz called the online version of the book, which is available in multiple online locations, a "wonderful compendium". The online version of World Scripture is linked to by many collegiate and independent websites as a comparative religion resource.

== Other accomplishments ==
In Controversial New Religions, James A. Beverly describes Wilson as "a leading Unification scholar." Wilson has been editor of UTS's academic Journal of Unification Studies since its inception in 1997 and of all the contributors of this journal, he has the most hits, with 194,242, with his paper entitled "40th Anniversary Forum: The Unification Church in America". Wilson led the translation committee for the main scripture of the Unification Church, Exposition of the Divine Principle. and co-author of Cultivating Heart and Character: Educating for Life's Most Essential Goals. Wilson serves as senior advisor and chair of the editorial board for the Unification Church-sponsored New World Encyclopedia.

Born a Jew, Wilson performs speaking and leadership roles in the Unification Church's Middle East Peace Initiative, with a focus on Christian–Jewish reconciliation. He received his undergraduate degree from Harvard University in 1971, and later obtained an M.T.S from Harvard Divinity School and Ph.D. from Harvard. Wilson was subject to a forced deprogramming attempt in 1975, and in late 1980 protested a Harvard talk on the subject by cult critic Margaret Thaler Singer. Wilson joined the faculty of Unification Theological Seminary in 1985, the year his Ph.D. thesis was published. At UTS, Wilson currently teaches a variety of scriptural studies, living traditions, and theology courses.

== See also ==
- List of Unification movement people
- Unification Church
- Unification Church of the United States
