= Robert Grant (astronomer) =

Scottish astronomer

Robert Grant, FRS (17 June 1814 – 24 October 1892) was a Scottish astronomer.

== Career ==
He was born on 17 June 1814 at Grantown-on-Spey, Morayshire, where his father was engaged in trade. An illness of six years interrupted his education, and he taught himself, on his recovery at age 19, in Greek, Latin, French, Italian, and mathematics. After some brief study at King's College, Aberdeen, he entered in 1841 his brother's counting-house in London, and there set about collecting materials for a history of astronomy.

Grant pursued researches in Paris from 1845 to 1847, earning a livelihood by teaching English while attending Arago's and Leverrier's lectures. His History of Physical Astronomy from the Earliest Ages to the Middle of the Nineteenth Century, partially issued by the Society of Useful Knowledge in 1848–9, appeared in a complete form in March 1852, and earned Grant the award in 1856 of the Royal Astronomical Society's gold medal. He was elected a fellow of the Society on 14 June 1850; he edited the Monthly Notices 1852–60, and sat on the council 1853–60. In 1855 and 1865, he received degrees of M.A. and LL.D. respectively from the university of Aberdeen, and was elected a Fellow of the Royal Society in the latter year.

Having qualified as a practical astronomer by working for some months at the Royal Observatory, Greenwich, Grant was appointed in 1859 to succeed John Pringle Nichol as professor of astronomy and director of the observatory in the university of Glasgow. The only available part of its equipment was a six-inch transit-circle by Ertel, (Note: Ertel (Traugott Lebrecht Ertel [Fribourg 1778 - Munich 1858]) built mathematical instruments at the Mathematical-Mechanical Institute of Munich.) and with it Grant made a long series of meridian observations, the results of which were embodied in A Catalogue of 6415 Stars for the Epoch 1870, published at Glasgow in 1883. The introduction contains a discussion of proper motions. A supplementary Catalogue of 2156 Stars appeared a few weeks after his death. Both were compiled with the minimum of assistance.

A nine-inch Cooke equatorial was mounted under Grant's supervision in 1863, and was employed by him for observations of planets, comets, and double stars. He joined the Himalaya expedition to Spain for the total eclipse of 18 July 1860, and from his station near Vittoria watched the disclosure of the chromosphere and prominences, the true nature of which he had been one of the first to infer. He originated in 1861 the electrically controlled time service of Glasgow, and co-operated with Sir George Biddell Airy in 1865 in determining, by means of galvanic signals, the difference of longitude between Glasgow and Greenwich. The Leonid meteors of 1866 and 1868, the Andromeda of 1872 and 1885, and the ingress of Venus at the transit of 1882 were observed by him, and formed the subjects of communications to the Royal Astronomical Society. In a letter to the Times of 20 Sept. 1867, he traced the forged Pascal papers to their source in the third edition of Newton's Principia.

Grant died on 24 October 1892 at Grantown-on-Spey.

== Family ==
He married on 3 Sept. 1874 Elizabeth Emma Davison of Newcastle, New South Wales, and co. Monaghan, Ireland, by whom he left one son and three daughters.

== Works ==
He published translations of Arago's Biographies of Distinguished Scientific Men, 1854, and Popular Treatise on Comets, 1861; and, with Admiral William Henry Smyth, of Arago's Popular Astronomy, 2 vols. 1855 and 1858. Many articles by him were inserted in Knight's English Cyclopaedia, and he contributed as well to the Astronomische Nachrichten, the Comptes Rendus, and the Proceedings of the Philosophical Society of Glasgow, of which body he acted as president during three years.

== Bibliography ==
- Paola Presciuttini (1989). Extract from The instrumentation in the history of the Astronomical Observatory of Brera published by Milan University. www.sullacrestadellonda.it. Archived from the original on 3 March 2016.

Academic offices
Preceded by John Nichol	Regius Professor of Practical Astronomy at Glasgow University; 1859–1893	Succeeded by Ludwig Becker
