= Peter Alan Sweet =

English astronomer

- Born: 15 May 1921; Beckenham, Kent, England
- Died: 16 January 2005 (aged 83); Poole, Dorset, England
- Education: Kingsbury County Grammar School
- Alma mater: Sidney Sussex College, Cambridge
- Known for: Sweet–Parker model Eddington–Sweet circulation
- Scientific career
- Fields: Astronomy; Mathematics
- Workplaces: Ministry of Aircraft Production; University of Glasgow
- Academic advisors: Fred Hoyle

Peter Alan Sweet (15 May 1921 – 16 January 2005) was an English astronomer. He was Regius Professor of Astronomy at the University of Glasgow from 1959 until his retirement in 1982. He was also Dean of the Faculty of Science 1973–1975.

Under Sweet's stewardship, the Department of Astronomy grew from 3 to 17 permanent staff. Sweet undertook the building of a new University Observatory located at Acre Road, Glasgow which opened in 1967. The department offices were moved to the top floor of the then new Mathematics Building in University Gardens, within the main University campus.

Sweet was educated at Kingsbury County Grammar School and Wrangler 1942 on a Major Open Scholarship in Maths at Sidney Sussex College, Cambridge. He worked as a Junior Scientific Officer at the Ministry of Aircraft Production from 1942 until the end of the World War II. He took a position as a lecturer in Astronomy at the University of Glasgow in 1947. He then moved to become Assistant Director of the University of London Observatory from 1952 until his appointment to the Regius Chair in Glasgow in 1959.

Academic offices
Preceded by William Marshall Smart	Regius Professor of Practical Astronomy at the University of Glasgow; 1959–1982	Succeeded by John Campbell Brown
