= Ludwig Becker (astronomer) =

British astronomer (1860–1947)

Ludwig Wilhelm Emil Ernst Becker
- Born: 8 January 1860; Wesel, Kingdom of Prussia
- Died: 11 November 1947 (aged 87); Lagundo, Italy
- Citizenship: British (naturalized in 1893)
- Education: University of Berlin; University of Bonn
- Scientific career
- Fields: Astronomy
- Workplaces: Glasgow University

Ludwig Wilhelm Emil Ernst Becker FRSE (8 January 1860 – 11 November 1947) was Regius Professor of Astronomy at the University of Glasgow from 1893 until 1935 when he retired.

== Life ==
Born in Wesel, Kingdom of Prussia, Becker was educated at the University of Bonn. After two years as an assistant in the Berlin Observatory, the Earl of Crawford and Balcarres appointed him in 1885 to take charge of his large private observatory at Dunecht, near Aberdeen. When that institution was wound up in the autumn of 1888, the instruments were passed on to the Lords Commissioners of the Treasury for a new Royal Observatory. A site on Blackford Hill in Edinburgh was selected in 1889 and Becker was included on the staff. He was appointed to the Glasgow Chair of Astronomy four years later.

Ludwig was a popular lecturer at Glasgow and it was claimed that his classes were better attended than those of any other astronomy course in the United Kingdom.

His research areas were extensive and he was a master of celestial mechanics. They included;

- investigation on the distribution of blue-violet light in the solar corona at the eclipse of 30 August 1905, in Tunisia;
- a long and careful investigation on the constant of aberration undertaken with the Glasgow Transit Circle;
- a capture hypothesis relating to Binary stars, in which he showed how such a system could capture a third star, losing in the process one of its own components, and how the hypothesis could account for the high eccentricities of binary star orbits.

Ludwig retired from the Chair of Astronomy in 1935. He left the University Observatory well equipped for contemporary needs, and in his earlier years he added significantly to its instrument collection.

He died in Lagundo in Italy.

== Anti-German sentiment ==
Although Becker had become a naturalized British citizen in 1892 before his appointment to Glasgow, this fact failed to save him from embarrassment and unmerited suspicion during the Great War; local public opinion forced his absence from the University. He retired to seclusion in Aviemore, the Highlands, where he lived until the end of hostilities. This period had a negative effect upon his output in the post-war years. W.M. Smart records that, "Becker was one of the gentlest of men, modest and retiring in disposition and, whatever the outside world thought, respected and esteemed by his students both for his learning and his kindly qualities."

Academic offices
Preceded by Robert Grant	Regius Professor of Practical Astronomy at Glasgow University; 1893–1937	Succeeded by William Marshall Smart
