= John Campbell Brown =

Scottish astronomer (1947–2019)

John Campbell Brown OBE FRSE
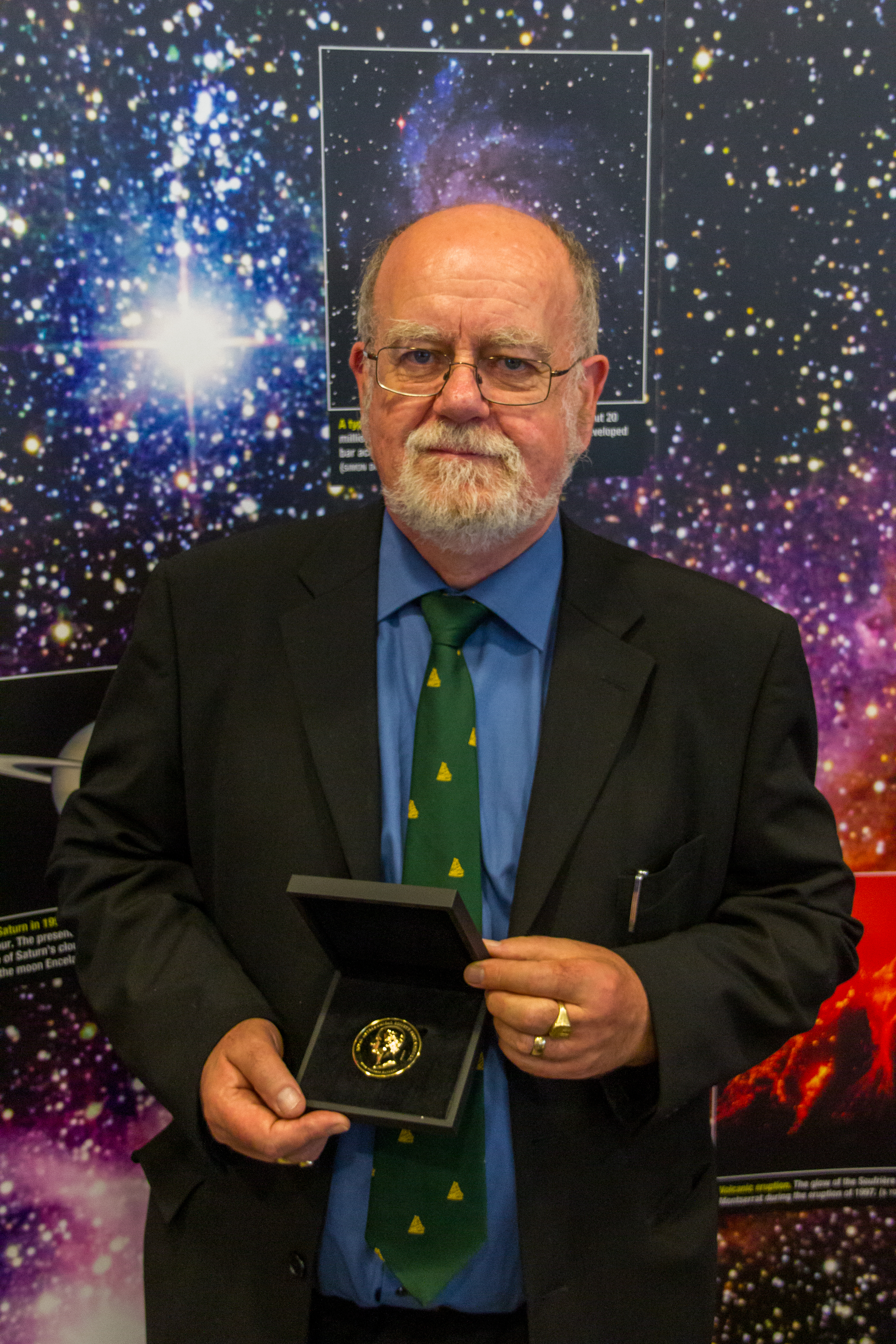
- John Brown receiving the Gold Medal of the Royal Astronomical Society in 2012
- Born: 4 February 1947
- Died: 16 November 2019 (aged 72)
- Occupation: Astronomer
- Awards: Gold Medal of the Royal Astronomical Society (2012); Fellowship of the Royal Society of Edinburgh (1984); Officer of the Order of the British Empire (2016)
- Website: www.johncbrown.org
- Academic career
- Fields: Astronomy
- Institutions: University of Glasgow (1968–2019); University of Edinburgh (1996–2019); University of Aberdeen (1998–2019)
- Academic advisor: Peter Alan Sweet
- Position held: Astronomer Royal for Scotland (1995–2019)

John Campbell Brown OBE FRSE (4 February 1947 – 16 November 2019) was a Scottish astronomer who worked primarily in solar physics. He held the posts of Astronomer Royal for Scotland, the Regius Professor of Astronomy at the University of Glasgow, and honorary professorships at both the University of Edinburgh and the University of Aberdeen.

== Personal life ==
Brown was born in Dumbarton, Scotland, in 1947. His interest in astronomy started around age eight, when he read a science fiction novel by Patrick Moore. It developed further in 1957 when he saw Comet Arend–Roland through binoculars when aged 10, in the same year that the Lovell Telescope at Jodrell Bank Observatory opened and Moore's television series The Sky at Night began. Brown built telescopes in his youth, helped by his father, who was an engineer.

He later married Margaret, and had two children. He died suddenly at his home on the Isle of Skye in the early hours of Saturday 16 November 2019, at the age of 72.

== Education ==
Brown went to Hartfield Primary in Dumbarton from 1952 to 1958 and Dumbarton Academy from 1958 to 1964. He started an astronomy club aged 16, and later built a 15 cm (6 in) telescope for the club. He studied for an undergraduate degree in physics & astronomy at the University of Glasgow, earning a first class BSc in 1968. While an undergraduate, he constructed 12-and-22-centimetre-diameter (4 1/2-and-8 1/2-inch) telescopes. Brown went on to receive a PhD in solar plasma physics in 1973, with a thesis on hard X-rays from the Sun. He received a DSc degree (a higher doctorate) in plasma astrophysics in 1984.

== Career ==
The University of Glasgow employed him as an astronomy research assistant in 1968–70 and lecturer from 1970, while he was still studying for his PhD. In 1978 he was promoted to senior lecturer, and then reader in 1980. He received a research fellowship from the Nuffield Foundation in 1983–1984. He was then promoted to chair of astrophysics from 1984 and became the Regius Professor of Astronomy in 1996. Beginning in 1986, he was head of Glasgow's astronomy & astrophysics research group. Brown received additional appointments as honorary professor at the University of Edinburgh from 1996, and the University of Aberdeen from 1998.

He taught astronomy at all university levels, from first year undergraduate to postgraduate courses.

== Research ==
He led the University of Glasgow research group in theory and modelling of solar and stellar plasmas. Brown used spacecraft data to investigate solar high energy particles and studied solar flares. He is perhaps best known in the community for the development of the Cold Thick Target Model for Solar X-Ray generation.

== Outreach ==
In his role as Astronomer Royal for Scotland, he gave public talks and performances to generate wider awareness of astronomy and its role in culture. His efforts in science communication incorporated magic tricks and poetry in the Scots language.

== Honours ==
He was elected a fellow of the Royal Society of Edinburgh in 1984. He was appointed the 10th Astronomer Royal for Scotland in February 1995. He was awarded the Gold Medal of the Royal Astronomical Society for his work on solar energetic particles and other contributions to astrophysical research and public outreach. Brown was appointed an Officer of the Order of the British Empire (OBE) in the 2016 Birthday Honours for services to the promotion of astronomy and science education.
