= William Millar (British Army officer) =

Lieutenant-General William Millar (died 1838), was a British Royal Artillery officer during the French Revolutionary and Napoleonic Wars; and later he was Colonel Commandant Royal Artillery.

== Biography ==
Millar was the second son of the Scottish philosopher and historian John Millar (1735–1801), He received a direct appointment as 2nd lieutenant Royal Artillery 24 May 1781. His subsequent commissions were: 1st lieutenant 1787, captain lieutenant 1794, captain 1799, major (brevet 1805) 1806, lieutenant-colonel 1806, colonel (brevet 4 June) 14 June 1814, major-general 1831, colonel commandant 1834, lieutenant-general 1837.

He served eighteen years in the West Indies, and was present at the capture of most of the French islands during the early part of the revolutionary wars. In 1804, on the rebuilding of Woolwich Arsenal after the great fire of 1802, he was appointed assistant to Colonel Fage in the royal carriage department, and was one of the officers to whose skill and indefatigable exertions during the Peninsular War the services were indebted for their material. With mechanical resources which, judged by a later standard, were of the most imperfect description, they poured forth a never failing supply of a quality and excellence which were the admiration of other armies, and at the close of the war led to the French commission of Baron Dupin to inquire into the system that could produce such results.

Millar was the originator of the 10-inch and 8-inch shell guns which formed so large a part of British armaments from 1832 until some years after the Crimean War. He was among the first to perceive the advantages of shell guns of large calibre; and as early as 1820, that is to say two years before the publication of Henri-Joseph Paixhans' Nouvelle Force Maritime, brought forward his first 8-inch shell gun. He was appointed inspector-general of artillery in 1827, and director-general of the field-train department in 1833.

Millar died from self-inflicted injuries near Hastings, on 14 March 1838. He had previously exhibited symptoms of suicidal mania.

== Family ==
Millar was married and left a grown-up family.
