= Wilson (crater) =

Lunar surface depression

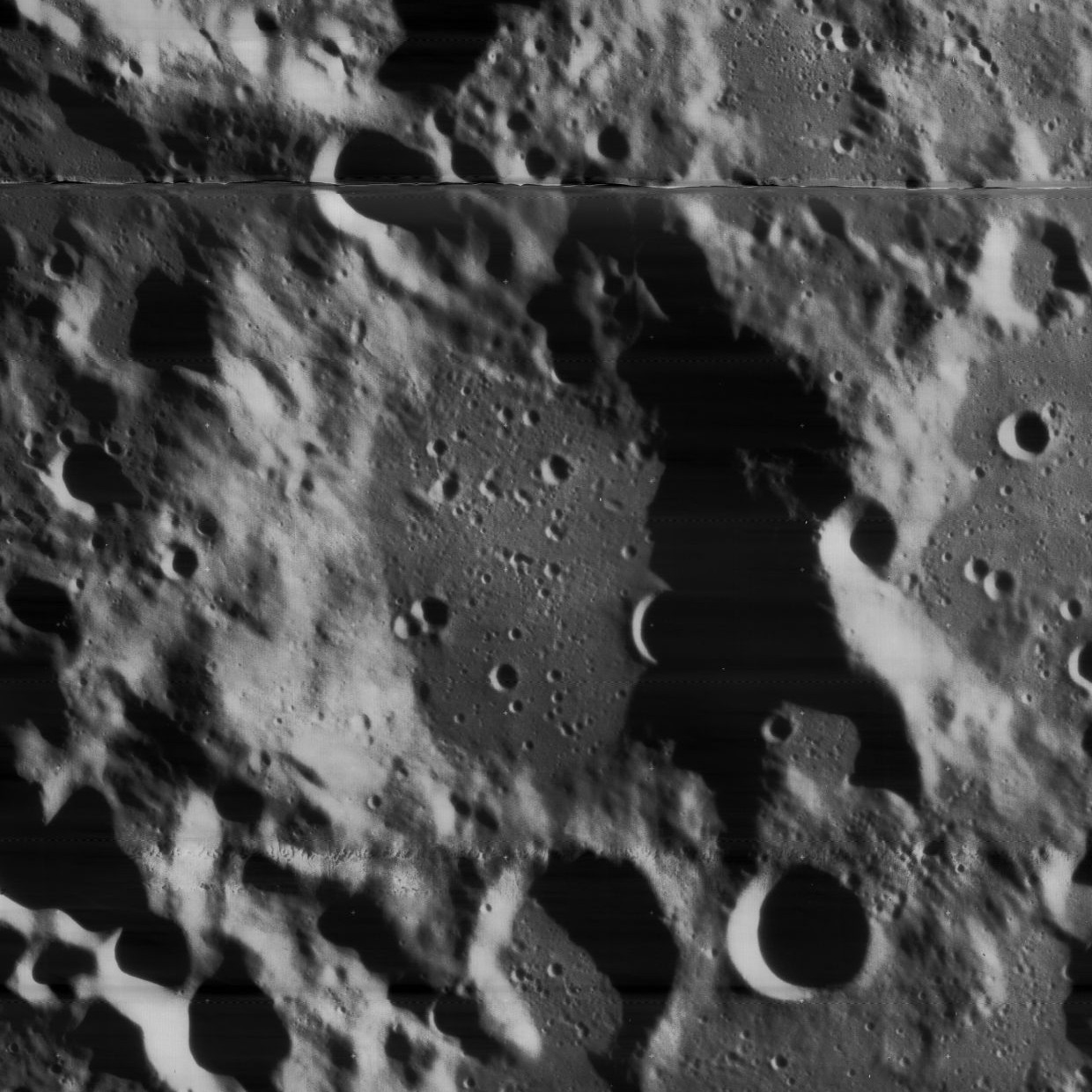
- Lunar Orbiter 4 image
- Coordinates: 69.2°S 42.4°W
- Diameter: 69 km
- Depth: 3.4 km
- Colongitude: 45° at sunrise
- Eponym: Alexander Wilson; Charles T. R. Wilson; Ralph E. Wilson

Wilson is a lunar impact crater that lies in the southern part of the Moon's near side, to the southwest of a large walled plain named Clavius. It is nearly attached to the southeastern rim of the slightly larger crater Kircher. Almost due east lies Klaproth, another walled plain.

This crater has a heavily eroded outer rim that now forms an irregular rise about the relatively level interior floor. The flooded remains of a crater intrudes part way into the rim and inner wall along the south-southeastern section. Several other small craters lie along the eastern and northern rim. The narrow section of surface between Wilson and Kircher is irregular and contains a small, cup-shaped crater that joins both outer rims. The interior floor is marked by a number of tiny craterlets of various dimensions, and there is a small crater along the edge of the eastern inner wall.

== Satellite craters ==
By convention these features are identified on lunar maps by placing the letter on the side of the crater midpoint that is closest to Wilson.

Wilson	Latitude	Longitude	Diameter
A	71.3° S	53.5° W	15 km
C	71.9° S	45.1° W	26 km
E	72.5° S	55.0° W	24 km
F	70.4° S	39.3° W	13 km
