= James Mylne (philosopher) =

Scottish philosopher and academic (1757–1839)

James Mylne (Kinnaird, Gowrie, 3 September 1757 – 21 September 1839) was a Scottish philosopher and academic who was born in Perthshire in 1757 and educated at the University of St Andrews. He served as Professor of Moral Philosophy at the University of Glasgow from 1797 to 1837. His father-in-law was the philosopher John Millar and the philosopher James McCosh was among his students. He was a member of the Glasgow Literary Society.

He was also the great-uncle of Frances Wright, who lived with him for a time. Mylne is the subject of a biography, Rational Piety and Social Reform in Glasgow (Wipf and Stock, 2015), by Dr Stephen Cowley. Mylne's philosophy was a theistic empiricism and he regarded utility as the primary measure of morality. He found a larger place for reason in mental life than his predecessors at Glasgow Francis Hutcheson and Thomas Reid, of the moral sense and common sense schools respectively. Mylne also lectured on political economy at the University of Glasgow from a standpoint generally sympathetic to Adam Smith. Politically he was a Whig.

Some of his notes in manuscript are held by the Special Collections Department of the Library of the University of Glasgow. Other student notes are held by the Mitchell Library, Glasgow, New College Library, Edinburgh and the National Library of Scotland, Edinburgh.
