= John Pringle Nichol =

Scottish educator, phrenologist, astronomer and economist

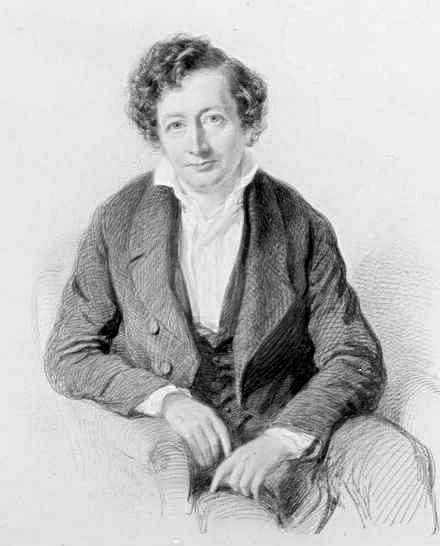
John Pringle Nichol

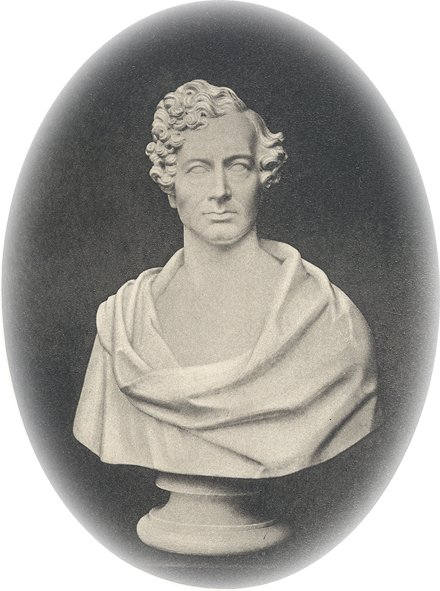
John Pringle Nichol

John Pringle Nichol FRSE FRAS (13 January 1804 – 19 September 1859) was a Scottish educator, phrenologist, astronomer and economist who did much to popularise astronomy in a manner that appealed to nineteenth century tastes.

== Early life ==
Born at Huntly Hill, near Brechin, Angus, Nichol was the son of John Nichol from Northumberland, a gentleman farmer, and his wife Jane Forbes from Ellon, Aberdeenshire. He was educated at the local grammar school and then studied mathematics and natural philosophy (physics) at King's College, University of Aberdeen. He then changed to study divinity. He was licensed as a preacher and became a highly effective communicator, but the impact of phrenological thinking led him to abandon the Church for education.

Nichol held a number of posts in education and journalism and corresponded with many leading thinkers of the times, including John Stuart Mill. He clearly made some impression in economics as James Mill and Nassau Senior nominated him as Jean-Baptiste Say's successor as professor of political economy at the Collège de France though he was at the time too ill to take the post.

== Astronomy ==
In 1836 and in competition with Thomas Carlyle, Nichol was appointed Regius Professor of Astronomy at the University of Glasgow. He became an enthusiastic and effective lecturer and made a profound impression on William Thomson, 1st Baron Kelvin with his introduction of the "Continental" approach to mathematical physics of Jean Baptiste Joseph Fourier. He lived at the Glasgow Observatory.

Nichol turned to popular lecturing and authored a number of popular and successful books about astronomy, especially championing the nebular hypothesis. In 1841 George Eliot wrote:

I have been revelling in Nichol's Architecture of the Heavens and Phenomena of the Solar System, and have been in imagination winging my flight from system to system, and from universe to universe ...

William John Macquorn Rankine declared Nichol's Dictionary of the Physical Sciences to be:

... almost unparalleled for the extent and accuracy of the information that it contains in a small bulk."

== Private life ==
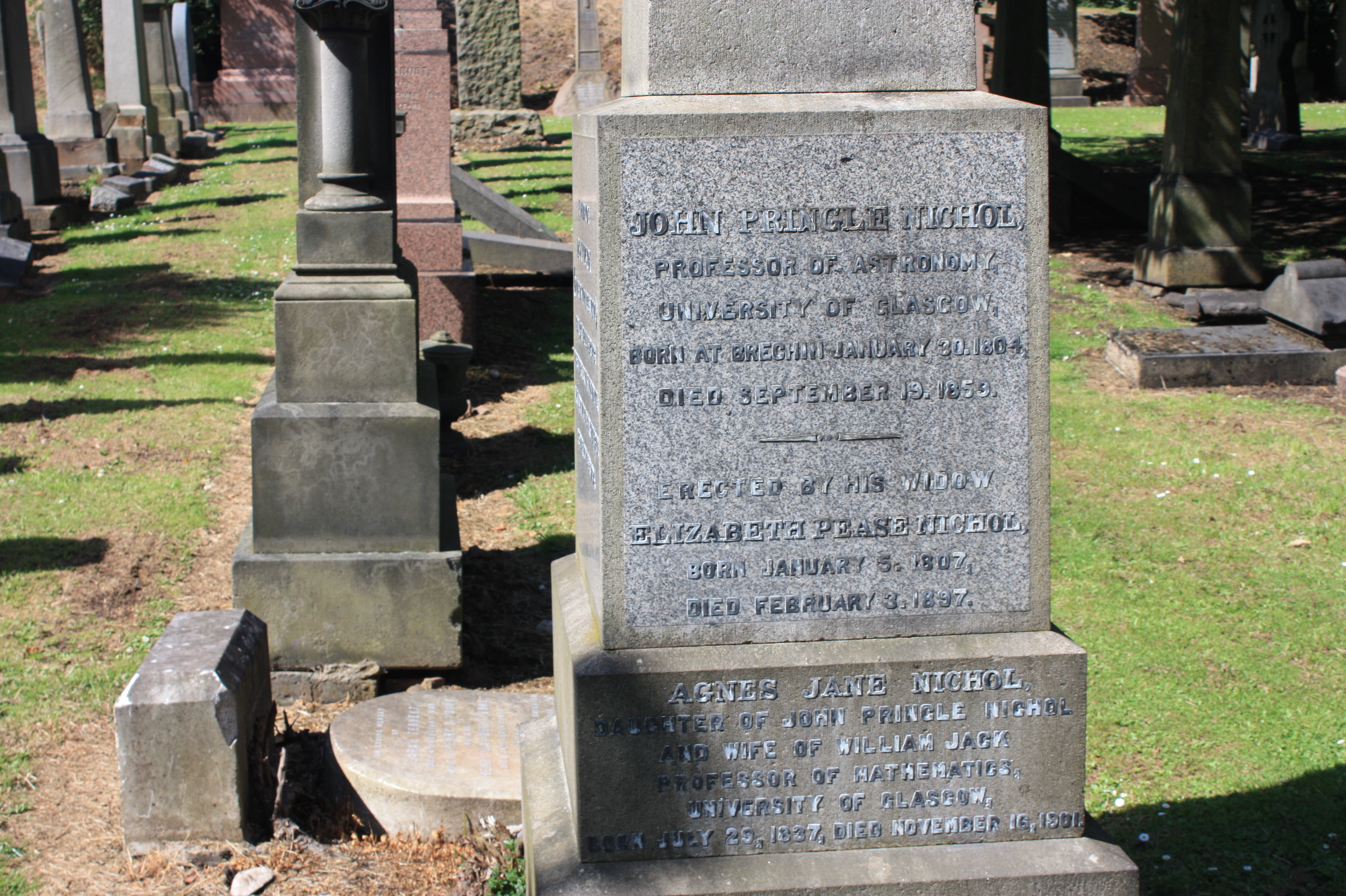
grave of John Pringle Nichol, Grange Cemetery, Edinburgh

In 1831 Nichol married Jane Tullis of Cupar in Fife (1813–1851).

Their eldest son, John Nichol became a literary critic and writer. Jane died in 1850. Nichol married secondly Elizabeth Pease in 1853, a prominent reformer and member of the Darlington Pease family, much against her family's wishes. His daughter, Agnes Jane Nichol, married the mathematician William Jack FRSE (1834–1924).

Nichol was a member of the Edinburgh Phrenological Society.

During the late 1840s, his health declined and, stemming from his physician's prescription, Nichol became addicted to opiates. He recorded an account of his drug-addiction illness and its cure by hydrotherapy at the Ben Rhydding Hydro in his book Memorials from Ben Rhydding (1852).

He died at Glenburn House in Rothesay but is buried in Grange Cemetery in south Edinburgh.

== Bibliography ==
- Nichol, J.P. (1837). Views of the Architecture of the Heavens. Edinburgh: William Tait.
- — (1838). The Phenomena and Order of the Solar System. Edinburgh: William Tait.
- — (1840). Views of the Architecture of the Heavens. New York: H. A. Chapin & Co. (American edition, expanded with notes and glossary)
- — (1844). Contemplations on the Solar System. Edinburgh: William Tait. Bibcode:1844cssy.book.....N.
- — (2006) [1846]. Thoughts on Some Important Points Relating to the System of the World. Kessinger. ISBN 1-4286-5171-3.
- — (1848). The Stellar Universe. Edinburgh: John Johnstone.
- — (1848). The Planet Neptune: An Exposition and History. Edinburgh: John Johnstone.
- — (1856) General Principles in Geology, the preface to Keith Johnston's Physical Atlas 2nd edition.
- — (1857). Cyclopedia of the Physical Sciences.
- Coutts, J. (1909). A History of the University of Glasgow.

=== Obituaries ===
- Monthly Notices of the Royal Astronomical Society, 19 (1858–9), 141; 20 (1859–60), 131;
- The Times, 23 September 1859, 10b

Academic offices
Preceded by James Couper	Regius Professor of Practical Astronomy at Glasgow University; 1836–1859	Succeeded by Robert Grant
