= Kircher (crater) =

Lunar surface depression

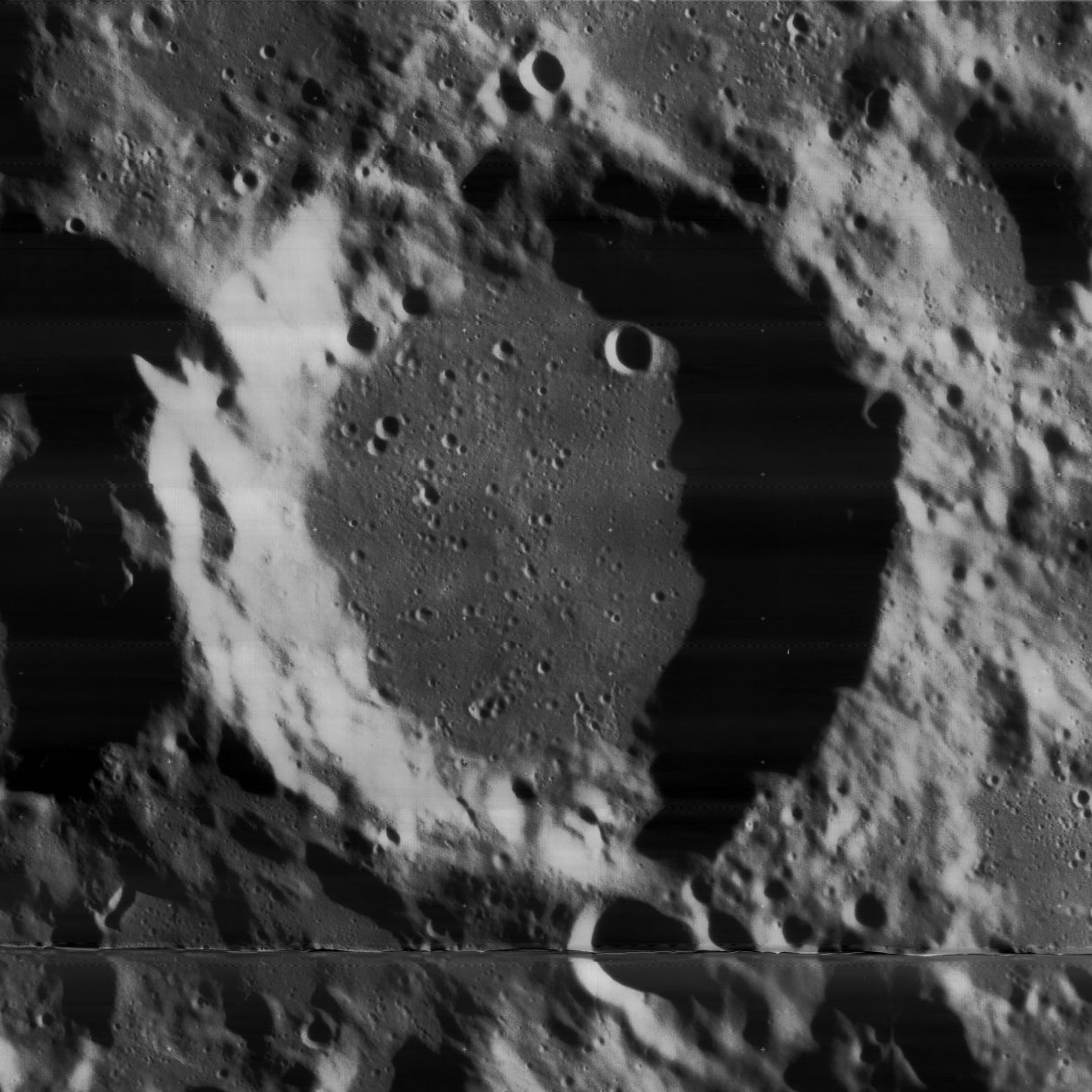
- Lunar Orbiter 4 image
- Coordinates: 67.1°S 45.3°W
- Diameter: 72 km
- Depth: 4.3 km
- Colongitude: 47° at sunrise
- Eponym: Athanasius Kircher

Kircher is a lunar impact crater that is located in the south-southwestern part of the Moon, near the southern limb. In this position the crater appears foreshortened when viewed from the Earth. It is less than one crater diameter due south of the crater Bettinus, and is nearly attached to Wilson along the south-southeast rim of Kircher.

== Appearance ==
This crater is distinctive for an interior floor that is level and nearly featureless. It is marked by only a few tiny craterlets, with a single small craterlet near the north-northeast inner wall. The rim and inner wall has been worn and rounded by impacts, although only a few tiny craters lie across the rim. Attached to the outside of the western rim is a crater pair, with the larger of the two designated Kircher D. A small, cup-shaped crater lies on the narrow neck of ground between Kircher and Wilson.

== Satellite craters ==
By convention these features are identified on lunar maps by placing the letter on the side of the crater midpoint that is closest to Kircher.

Kircher	Latitude	Longitude	Diameter
A	66.1° S	42.1° W	29 km
B	65.0° S	43.1° W	12 km
C	66.9° S	37.5° W	11 km
D	67.5° S	49.8° W	39 km
E	69.1° S	50.1° W	20 km
F	66.1° S	38.9° W	10 km
