= William Meikleham =

- Born: 1771; Kilmarnock, East Ayrshire, Scotland
- Died: 7 May 1846 (aged 74–75)
- Education: Glasgow University
- Scientific career
- Fields: Astronomy
- Workplaces: Glasgow University

William Meikleham LLD (1771–1846) was Regius Professor of Astronomy at the University of Glasgow from 1799 to 1803. He resigned the Chair of Astronomy to become Professor of Natural Philosophy (Physics) in 1803, a position he held until his death in 1846.

Meikleham's first post was Rector of Ayr Academy in 1792. In 1794 he was employed as assistant to the Professor of Natural Philosophy at Glasgow. He conducted his duties so successfully that he continued to take classes after the incumbent Professor's death and during the tenure of his successor.

In August 1799, King George III issued a commission to William Meikleham to be Professor of Practical Astronomy and Observer at the University of Glasgow, and on 29 October 1799 he was admitted to office.

Professor William Meikleham had none of the fiercely conservative attitudes of others in the University. He proved to be a much more active and dynamic teacher than his colleagues, including his successor in the Chair of Practical Astronomy, James Couper.

== Artistic recognition ==
A portrait of Meikleham by James Miller formed part of a major exhibition of portraits of Glasgow figures in the 19th century. It was on loan from his daughter.

He was described by Elizabeth Thomson, Lord Kelvin's sister, as a good-natured, fat, little hunchback with a very red face.

== Early life and studies ==
William Meikleham was born in 1771 at Kilmarnock, Ayrshire, Scotland, the second son of schoolmaster William McIlquham.

He was a student at the University of Glasgow, from 1788 to 1792. During his time there he won several prizes and graduated MA.

== Royal Philosophical Society of Glasgow ==
On 9 November 1802 William Meikleham helped to found the Royal Philosophical Society of Glasgow and became its first president. The seal of the Royal Philosophical Society of Glasgow is thought to depict the transit of Mercury that occurred on the morning of 9 November 1802 – the day of the first meeting of the Society.

It is speculation that William Meikleham proposed the Seal design having observed the transit that very morning.

== Chair of Natural Philosophy ==
In August 1803 William Meikleham transferred from the Astronomy Chair to the Chair of Natural Philosophy. He was elected Clerk of Faculty in 1829 and 1830. He continued to lecture until the academic session of 1838-39, his health deteriorated and his classes were latterly covered by others in the department. By 1841 it became clear that Meikleham was unlikely to return to his classes and he died on 7 May 1846 aged 75.

== Later life ==
William Meikleham appears in the Post Office Glasgow Directories from 1801 to 1803 as Professor of Practical Astronomy. Then from 1804 until 1815 as Professor of Natural Philosophy. Although he continues to be professor of Natural Philosophy until his death in 1846 he does not appear to have a Glasgow address from 1816 onwards.

Academic offices
Preceded by Patrick Wilson	Regius Professor of Practical Astronomy at Glasgow University; 1799–1803	Succeeded by James Couper
