= Colin Campbell (astronomer) =

Scottish astronomer

Colin Campbell FRS
- Died: 26 January 1752; Kingston, Jamaica
- Education: University of Glasgow
- Spouse: Margaret Foster
- Scientific career
- Fields: Astronomy

Colin Campbell FRS (died 26 January 1752) was a Scottish astronomer.

He grew up in Jamaica and died there in Kingston in 1752. He matriculated at the University of Glasgow, in 1720. He was invested as a fellow of the Royal Society (FRS) on 7 November 1734. He studied Newton's theory of the diminution of gravity away from the equator. He made astronomical observations, in correspondence with Edmund Halley. He held the office of Member of the council (Jamaica) in 1742. After 1742, he sold his astronomical instruments to Alexander Macfarlane. In 1748, he lived at St. George Hanover Square, London.

In Jamaica, Campbell was a slaveholder and planter. In his will, Campbell bequeathed to his wife, Margaret Campbell, "the use and enjoyment of any of my Negroes at her own choice". In his will, he also bequeathed to his son, Colin, his "Negroes" at his two sugar plantations, Orange Bay and Fish River.

== Family ==
He was the son of Colonel John Campbell and Katherine Claiborne. He married Margaret Foster who died in London in 1786; they had children

- John Campbell b. 8 January 1735.

John Campbell left Jamaica in 1756 "owing to a bad state of health" but returned in 1767 to dispose of the estates in order to clear his debts.

- Elizabeth Campbell born 15 December 1736.
- Margaret Jane Campbell born a 6 January 1739. She died in Surrey in September 1771.
- Colin Campbell1 b. a 1747. He was a Lt. Colonel in the 1st Guards and died at Portman Square, London, in 1793 having contracted "the Dunkirk fever" while campaigning against the French in Flanders.

== Works ==
- "An Account of Some Observations Made in London, by Mr. George Graham, F.R.S. and at Black-River in Jamaica, by Colin Campbell, Esq; F.R.S. concerning the Going of a Clock; In Order to Determine the Difference between the Lengths of Isochronal Pendulums in Those Places". Communicated by J. Bradley, M. A. Astr. Prof. Savill. Oxon. F.R.S. Phil. Trans. 1733 38:302-314; doi:10.1098/rstl.1733.0048
