= Patrick Wilson (astronomer) =

British astronomer

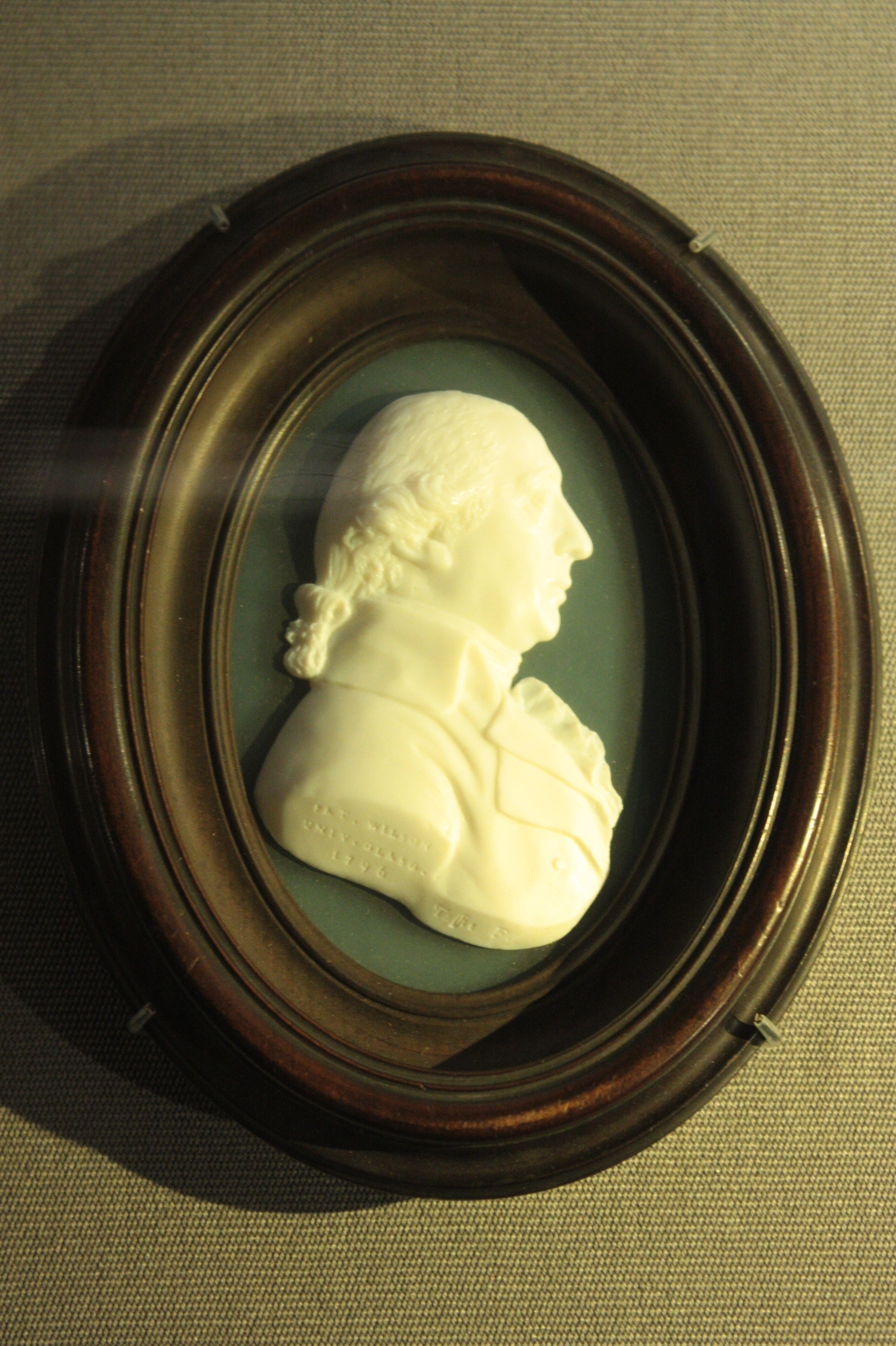
- Miniature of Patrick Wilson, 1796, from Scottish National Portrait Gallery
- Born: 16 January 1743; St Andrews, Scotland
- Died: 31 December 1811 (aged 68)
- Scientific career
- Fields: Astronomy; Mathematics; Meteorology; Type-making
- Workplaces: University of Glasgow

Patrick Wilson FRSE LLD (often Anglicised as Peter Wilson) (1743 – 1811) was a Scottish astronomer, type-founder, mathematician and meteorologist. He was the Regius Professor of Practical Astronomy at the University of Glasgow from 1784 to 1799.

In 1783 he was one of the several joint founders of the Royal Society of Edinburgh.

== Life ==
Wilson was born on 16 January 1743, the second son of Jean Sharp and Alexander Wilson, the first Regius Professor of Practical Astronomy the University of Glasgow. He was appointed his father's successor in 1784 before his father resigned the position. Likely due to the failing health of his father, they shared the role until his father's death in 1786.

He was Clerk of the University Senate from 1783 to 1795 and 1796 to 1799, and was awarded an honorary LLD in 1800. In 1782 he was employed as an assistant to his father, to take care of instruments, make observations, and help with teaching.

Patrick Wilson continued his father's type-founding business in Glasgow. He was elected Fellow of the Royal Society of Edinburgh on 17 November 1783. Also in 1783, Patrick was elected Clerk to the Senate of the University. He was re-elected each year until 1799 with the exception of 1795, when the Senate minutes record that Patrick Cumin was elected in his absence.

Wilson was appointed Regius Professor of Practical Astronomy to succeed his father in 1784, but his father retained the post until his death in 1786. At the end of his period in office in 1799, Wilson bequeathed scientific instruments to the University and £1,000, the interest on which was to be used to support his successors in the Chair.

He appears to have left Glasgow in 1799 and thereafter lived in London.

He died in Kensington Square, London on 30 December 1811.

== Correspondence with William Herschel ==
Extract from The Scientific Papers of Sir William Herschel, Volume 1:

...The friendship with Doctor (afterwards Sir William) Watson, jun., formed at Bath, was continued till Herschel's death, and brought about a frequent intercourse by letters and many exchanges of visits.

This was also the case with Patrick Wilson, the son and successor of Professor Alexander Wilson of Glasgow. He corresponded with Herschel from 1783; in 1795 he expressed some regret that his father's name and his views on the constitution of the sun had not been mentioned in Herschel's paper on the same subject; but Herschel's reply to this letter seems to have satisfied him perfectly. Wilson resigned his professorship at Glasgow at the end of 1798, and settled in London (from 1805 at Windmill Hill, Hampstead), and he and his sister were on the most cordial terms with Herschel and his wife and sister, and often paid visits to Slough. His letters are always very lengthy (there are more than eighty of them extant); in the years 1807-1810 there is a good deal in them on coloured rings, on which subject he sided with Herschel against the Royal Society. He died in 1811.

With Maskelyne Herschel also corresponded frequently...

== Correspondence with Benjamin Franklin ==
Patrick Wilson corresponded with Benjamin Franklin for example:

Monday Augt. 3d 1772
Dear Sir
I take my departure for Glasgow in a few Hours, having heard yesterday Evening of an 
inviting Opportunity of a Ship for the Forth which sails immediately.
Im sorry that Im so much hurried as not to be able to see You before I go. I shall 
take Care and deliver the Vollume of the American Transactions to the Questor of our 
Library. I beg the favour of being remembered to Mr. Small; I ever am most faithfully 
and most respectfully Your’s

Pat. Wilson

Addressed: To / Doctor Franklin / at Mrs. Stevenson’s / Craven Street / Strand

(Presumably, Wilson was carrying out the request in William Smith’s letter of 16 May, to present the University of Glasgow with a copy of the first volume of the American Philosophical Society Transactions.)

Another document from Wilson to Benjamin Franklin dated Glasgow University, 27 May 1786 is interesting in that Wilson signs the letter "Patrick Wilson, joint Professor of Astronomy". This being the period when his father Alexander was still in the Regius chair and after he was appointed his successor.

Academic offices
Preceded by Alexander Wilson	Regius Professor of Practical Astronomy at Glasgow University; 1784–1799	Succeeded by William Meikleham
