= John Millar (philosopher) =

Scottish philosopher, jurist and historian (1735–1801)

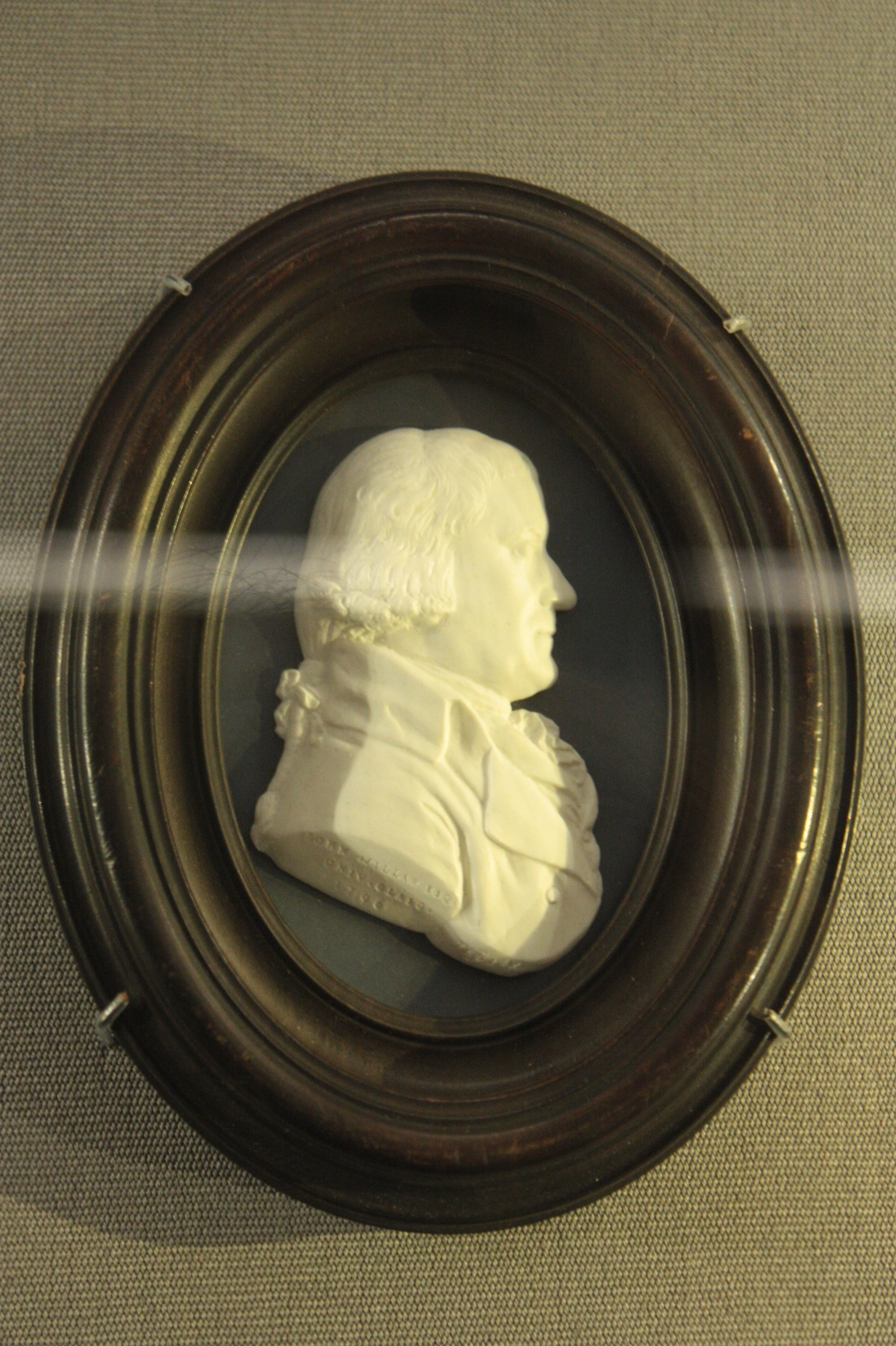
Miniature of Prof John Millar, 1796, Scottish National Portrait Gallery

John Millar of Glasgow (22 June 1735 – 30 May 1801) was a Scottish philosopher, historian and Regius Professor of Civil Law at the University of Glasgow from 1761 to 1800.

== Biography ==
Born a son of the manse of the Kirk o' Shotts, Shotts, Lanarkshire, John Millar was educated by an uncle and then, on his father being transferred to the parish of Hamilton, at the Old Grammar School of Hamilton (renamed the Hamilton Academy in 1848.) Continuing his studies at the University of Glasgow, he became one of the most important followers of Adam Smith, the founder of economic science. For a short time in the 1750s he was tutor in the household of Henry Home, Lord Kames. In 1760 he was admitted to the Faculty of Advocates. From 1761 to 1800, Millar was Regius Professor of Civil Law at Glasgow, where his lectures gained him nationwide fame. His colleagues and supporters included Smith, Kames, and David Hume. Millar was elected Clerk of the Senate of the University of Glasgow in 1772.

Millar's Origin of the Distinction of Ranks, published in 1778, advanced the view that economic system determines all social relations, even those between the genders. Such a view later became known as economic determinism, and was an important influence on Marxism. Werner Sombart described Millar's book as "one of the best and most complete sociologies that we possess".

His Historical View of the English Government, published from 1787, was an important contemporary history of England, representing a milestone in the development of historiography. Millar engaged with other historians, drawing comparisons with the works and emphasised the social and economic bases of political system, which strongly differentiated his work from most of the earlier ones, which were more speculative than scientific.

== Family ==
Millar lost a daughter by consumption in 1791, and his wife in 1795. His eldest son, John, a promising young man, went to the bar, and married the daughter of Dr. Cullen. He published a book, "Elements of the Law relating to Insurances", in 1787. Ill-health and the unpopularity of the Whiggism which he inherited from his father induced him to emigrate in the spring of 1795 to America, where he died soon afterwards from a sunstroke.

Three sons and six daughters survived their father. Of these James became professor of mathematics at Glasgow; the second, William joined the Royal Artillery; the third was a writer to the signet. One daughter, Agnes was married to James Mylne, professor of moral philosophy at Glasgow, and another, Margaret, to Dr. John Thomson, by whom she was mother of Allan Thomson, professor of surgery at Edinburgh. He left his manuscripts to his eldest son, to Professor Mylne, and to John Craig, his nephew, by whom some were published in 1803.

== Memorials ==
In 1985 the John Millar Chair of Law at the University of Glasgow was established in his memory.

== Works ==
- Observations concerning the Distinction of Ranks in Society, 1771. Revised second edition, 1773.
- An Historical View of the English Government, 1787.
- An Historical View of the English Government from the Settlement of the Saxons in Britain to the Revolution in 1688. To which are subjoined some Dissertations Connected with the History of the Government from the Revolution to the Present Time, 3rd ed., ed. J. Mylne & J. Craig, 4 vols, Edinburgh, 1803
- (Anon.), Letters of Crito on the causes, objects, and consequences, of the present war, 1796
