= Regius Professor of Astronomy (Glasgow) =

Regius Chair of Astronomy University of Glasgow
- Incumbent; John Brown since 1996
- Precursor: Regius Professor of Practical Astronomy
- Formation: 1760
- First holder: Alexander Wilson
- Website: www.gla.ac.uk/physics

The Regius Chair of Astronomy is a Regius Professorship in the University of Glasgow.

Founded in 1760 with the title Practical Astronomy (and with the office of Observer in the University) the title was changed in 1893.

== History ==
The first holder of the chair was famed Scottish astronomer Alexander Wilson, who put forward the theory that the entire universe rotated around its centre (which was later found to be true for galaxies but not the universe), and discovered that sunspots viewed near the edge of the Sun's visible disk appear depressed below the solar surface, a phenomenon still referred to as the Wilson effect. The Professor was not at this time required to teach. Wilson employed his second son, Patrick, as his assistant and intended successor in 1782, with the approval of the university but not of the Crown. The Crown relented in 1784 and Patrick was appointed to the chair.

William Meikleham was then appointed to the chair in 1799, but resigned it in 1803 to become Professor of Natural Philosophy. He was succeeded by John Couper, previously Minister of Baldernock, who was succeeded in 1836 by John Nichol. Nichol led the Astronomical Institute of Glasgow in its initiative to erect an observatory on Horslethill in 1841, which later fell into difficulties due to Nichol's poor accounting. The observatory was taken over by the university in 1845. Nichol was noted for delivering inspiring lectures both to students and the general public, and also lectured for two years on Natural Philosophy when the Professor, William Meikleham, (his predecessor in the Astronomy Chair) was unwell, and when his students included the young Lord Kelvin.

Nichol died in 1859 and was succeeded by Robert Grant, who in 1883 published a Catalogue of 6,415 Stars for the Epoch 1870. Grant died in 1892 and was succeeded by Ludwig Becker, a German scientist originally from Bonn, who had moved to Scotland in 1885 as director of the observatory at Dunecht in Aberdeenshire. Becker was popular with students and was thought at the time to have the best-attended astronomy classes in Britain. He retired in 1935.

In 1937, William Smart was appointed to the chair, having previously been John Couch Adams Astronomer at the University of Cambridge. He wrote over twenty books and was President of the Royal Astronomical Society from 1949 to 1951. He retired in 1959 and was succeeded by Peter Sweet, formerly Assistant Director of the University of London Observatory. Sweet oversaw expansion of the Astronomy Department and construction of a new observatory on the university's Garscube site.

Upon Sweet's retirement in 1982, the Department of Astronomy was merged into the Department of Natural Philosophy, and John Campbell Brown was appointed to a new Chair of Astrophysics while the Regius Chair remained vacant. Brown was appointed Astronomer Royal for Scotland in 1995, and in 1996 was appointed to the revived Regius Chair of Astronomy. In 2010, the university marked the chair's 250th anniversary with a week of public lectures, an exhibition on inaugural holder Alexander Wilson in the Hunterian Museum., and by hosting the 2010 National Astronomy Meeting.

== Regius Professors of Astronomy ==
- Alexander Wilson (1760)
- Patrick Wilson (1784)
- William Meikleham (1799)
- James Couper (1803)
- John Nichol FRSE FRAS (1836)
- Robert Grant FRS (1859)
- Ludwig Becker FRSE (1893)
- William Marshall Smart FRSE PRAS LLD RIN (1937)
- Peter Allan Sweet (1959)
- John Campbell Brown OBE FRSE Astronomer Royal for Scotland (1996)

== See also ==
- List of Professorships at the University of Glasgow
