= Max (given name) =

Max (/ˈmæks/) is a unisex given name. For males, often short for Maximilian, Maxim, Maksym, Maxwell, Maxfield, or Maximus in English; Maximos in Greek; or Maxime or Maxence in French. For females, it is often short for Maxine.

Almost all Max names derive from the Latin Maximus, in circulation since the Classical Era and used in Ancient Rome as a cognomen. This was the third name in the three-part system known as the tria nomina. The cognomen began as a nickname and would have been given to men of the patrician class who demonstrated traits of greatness. The name Maximus was introduced to the Celtic Britons during the 1st century Roman occupation. Maximus the Confessor was a 7th-century monk and theologian from Constantinople.

Notable people and characters with the name include:

== People ==
=== A ===
- Max (Spanish cartoonist) (born 1956), pen name of Francesc Capdevila Gisbert
- Max (Korean singer) (born 1988), stage name of Korean singer Shim Chan-min
- Maximiano de Sousa (1910–1980), Portuguese Fado singer also known as Max
- Max (footballer, born 1975), full name Maxlei dos Santos Luzia, Brazilian footballer
- Max (footballer, born 1983), full name Max Brendon Costa Pinheiro, Brazilian footballer
- Max (footballer, born 1987), full name Maximiano Lélis Rodrigues, Brazilian footballer
- Max (footballer, born 1990), full name Marcil Elias da Silva, Brazilian footballer
- Max (footballer, born 2002), full name Maswel Ananis Silva, Brazilian footballer
- Max (drag queen), Max Malanaphy, a competitor on season 7 of RuPaul's Drag Race
- Max Abmas (born 2001), American basketball player
- Max Abrams (1907–1995), British drummer
- Max Adalbert (1874–1933), German actor
- Max Adams (born 1961), British author
- Max D. Adams, American screenwriter and author
- Max Adler (businessman) (1866–1952), American businessman
- Max Adler (Marxist) (1873–1937), Austrian jurist, politician and philosopher
- Max Adler (actor) (born 1986), American actor
- Max Adler (lacrosse) (born 1994), American lacrosse player
- Max Adrian (1903–1973), Irish actor
- Max Alves (born 2001), Brazilian footballer known simply as Max

=== B ===
- Max Baer (boxer) (1909–1959), American world heavyweight boxing champion
- Max Baer Jr. (born 1937), American, son of the boxer, actor on TV's The Beverly Hillbillies
- Max Baer (judge) (1947–2022), Pennsylvania Supreme Court justice
- Max Barskih (born 1990), Ukrainian singer and songwriter
- Baron Max Wladimir von Beck (1854–1943), Austrian politician
- Max Baucus (born 1941), American politician
- Max Beckmann (1884–1950), German artist
- Max Beerbohm (1872–1956), English essayist, parodist and caricaturist
- Max Bill (1908–1994), Swiss architect, artist, painter, industrial designer and graphic designer
- Max Birbraer (born 1980), Kazakhstan-born Israeli ice hockey forward
- Max Blumenthal (born 1977), American journalist
- Max Borghi (born 2000), American football player
- Max Born (1882–1970), German physicist, mathematician and Nobel laureate
- Max Bredeson (born 2002), American football player
- Max Briggs (born 1948), English footballer
- Max Brod (1884–1968), Czech-Israeli author, composer, and journalist
- Max Brode (1850–1917), German violinist and conductor
- Max Bromme (1878–1974), German architect
- Max Brooks (born 1972), American writer
- Max Brooks (politician) (born 1972), American politician
- Max Brosmer (born 2001), American football player
- Max Brown (British actor) (born 1981), British actor
- Max Brown (novelist) (1916–2003), Australian writer
- Max Brown (rugby league) (born 1946), Australian rugby league footballer
- Max Brown (politician) (died 2012), Australian politician
- Max Brown (footballer) (born 1999), English footballer
- Max Brown (baseball) (born 1993), New Zealand baseball player
- Max Brown (Australian actor), Australian actor
- Max Brown (canoeist) (born 1995), New Zealand canoeist
- Max Brown (American football) (born 2003), American football player
- Max Browne (born 1995), American football player
- Max Bruch (1838–1920), German composer and conductor
- Max Burkholder (born 1997), American child actor

=== C ===
- Max Cavalera (born 1969), Brazilian musician
- Max Clegg (born 1997), British speedway rider
- Max Cleland (1942–2021), Secretary of State of Georgia and Vietnam veteran
- Max Colby (born 1990), American artist
- Max Cole (filmmaker), American filmmaker
- Max Cole (footballer) (1941–2018), Australian rules footballer
- Max Cole (rugby league) (1951–2018), Australian rugby league footballer
- Max Coleman (1926–2022), South African politician
- Max Coleman (geoscientist), British geoscientist
- Max Coley (1927–1994), American football coach
- Max Coll (1932–2014), American politician from New Mexico
- Max Colli (born 1915), Austrian rower
- Max Collie (1931–2018), Australian Dixieland trombonist
- Max Collins (musician) (born 1978), American musician
- Max Collins (actress) (born 1992), American-Filipino actress and model
- Max Allan Collins (born 1948), American mystery writer
- Max Colodro (born 1967), Chilean scholar
- Max Colpet (1905–1998), American screenwriter
- Max Colt (born 1982), Ukrainian visual effect producer
- Max Coltheart (born 1939), Australian cognitive scientist
- Max Cooper (electronica musician), European electronica and techno musician
- Max Dale Cooper (born 1933), American immunologist

=== D ===
- Max Darling (born 2000), Vincentian-New Zealand basketball player
- Max Deisenhofer (born 1987), German politician
- Max Delbrück (1906–1981), German–American biophysicist
- Max Delbrück (chemist) (1850–1919), German agricultural chemist, uncle of the above
- Max Domi (born 1995), Canadian National Hockey League player
- Max Duggan (born 2001), American football player

=== E ===
- Max Eckard (1914–1998), German actor
- Max Ernst (1891–1976), German painter, sculptor, graphic artist and poet
- Max Evans (rugby union) (born 1983), Scotland international rugby union player
- Max Evans (Australian footballer) (1923–2006), Australian rules footballer
- Max Evans (politician) (1930–2019), Australian politician
- Max Evans (writer) (1924–2020), American writer

=== F ===
- Max Fink (1923–2025), American neurologist and psychiatrist
- Max Fleischer (1883–1972), Polish-American animator and film producer
- Max Fried (born 1994), American baseball pitcher for the Atlanta Braves
- Max Jakob Friedländer (1867–1958), German curator and art historian
- Marty Friedman (basketball) (1889–1986), Hall of Fame NBA pro basketball player and coach
- Max Frisch (1911–1991), Swiss novelist and playwright

=== G ===
- Max Gandrup (born 1967), Danish badminton player
- Max Gebhardt (1904–1993), German long-distance runner
- Max van Gelder (1924–2019), Dutch water polo player
- Max Geldner (1875–1958), Swiss footballer
- Max Geldray (1916–2004), Dutch jazz harmonica player
- Max Gelhaar (born 1997), German paralympic triathlete
- Max Geller (wrestler) (born 1971), Israeli wrestler
- Max Geller (activist) (born 1984), American activist
- Max Gemminger (1820–1887), German entomologist
- Max George (footballer) (born 1952), Australian rules footballer
- Max George (born 1988), English singer
- Max Gerbier (born 1951), Haitian painter
- Max Gergel (1921–2015), American chemist
- Max Gerl (born 1995), American musician
- Max Gerlach (1885–1958), German-born American literary model for The Great Gatsby
- Max Germaine (1914–2006), Australian fine art valuer and writer
- Max Gerson (1881–1959), German-American physician
- Max Geschwill (born 2001), German footballer
- Max Getz, American jeweller
- Max Geuter (1937–2018), German fencer
- Max Giesinger (born 1988), German singer-songwriter
- Max Glatt (1912–2002), German-British addiction treatment expert
- Max Green (musician) (born 1984), American musician
- Max Green (lawyer) (1952–1998), Australian lawyer, embezzler and murder victim
- Max Greenfield (born 1979), American actor
- Max Greyserman (born 1995), American golfer on the PGA Tour

=== H ===
- Max Harris (composer) (1918–2004), British film and television composer/arranger
- Max Hastings (born 1945), British journalist, editor, historian and author
- Max Hecker (1879–1964), Austrian-born Israeli President of the Technion – Israel Institute of Technology
- Max Heidegger (born 1997), American-Israeli basketball player in the Israeli Basketball Premier League
- Max Hirschberg (1883–1964), German lawyer and legal scholar
- Max Homa (born 1990), American golfer
- Max Huber (Canadian football) (1945–2018), American player in the Canadian Football League
- Max Huber (graphic designer) (1919–1992), Swiss graphic designer
- Max Huber (statesman) (1874–1960), Swiss lawyer and diplomat
- Max Hurleman (born 2001), American football player
- Max Hussarek von Heinlein (1865–1935), Austrian politician, Prime Minister of Austria in 1918

=== I ===
- Max Iheanachor (born 2003), Nigerian-American football player

=== J ===
- Max Jammer (1915–2010), Israeli physicist and Rector and Acting President of Bar-Ilan University
- Max Johnson (born 2001), American football player

=== K ===
- Max Karoubi (born 1938), French mathematician
- Max Kelly (1930–2007), Australian mathematician
- Max Kelly (footballer) (1909–1987), Australian rules footballer
- Max Keith (1903–1974), German businessman
- Max Kibardin (born 1976), Russian artist & fashion designer
- Max Kidd (American football) (1901–1975), American football player and coach
- Max Kidruk (born 1984), Ukrainian travelogue and fiction writer
- Max Kielbasa (1921–1980), American football player
- Max Kilsby (born 2003), English footballer
- Max W. Kimmich (1893–1980), German film director
- Max King (theologian) (1930–2023), American theologian
- Max King (runner) (born 1980), American long-distance runner
- Max King (rugby league) (born 1997), England international rugby league footballer
- Max King (footballer) (born 2000), Australian rules football player
- Max Kinnings (born 1966), English novelist and screenwriter
- Max Kinsey (born 2005), English association football player
- Max Klare (born 2003), American football player
- Max Klesmit (born 2002), American basketball player
- Max Klinger (1857–1920), German artitst
- Max Koegel (1895–1946), German Nazi commander of several concentration camps
- Max Konnor (born 1986 or 1987), American gay pornographic film actor
- Max Kouguère (born 1987), Central African basketball player

=== L ===
- Max Labovitch (1924–2018), Canadian National Hockey League player
- Max Lazar (born 1999), American Major League Baseball player
- Max Landa (1873–1933), Russian-born Austrian actor
- Max Lercher (born 1986), Austrian politician
- Max Liebermann (1847–1935), German painter
- Max Llewellyn (rugby union) (born 1999), Welsh rugby union player
- Max Llewellyn (American football) (born 2002), American football player
- Max Lorenz (tenor) (1901–1975), German heldentenor famous for Wagnerian roles
- Max Lundgren (1937–2005), Swedish children's writer

=== M ===
- Max Marcuse (1877–1963), Jewish-German/Israeli dermatologist and sexologist
- Max Margulis (1907–1996), American writer, voice coach, and left-wing activist
- Max Martin (born 1971), Swedish record producer and songwriter
- Max Friedrich Meyer (1873–1967), German-born American psychologist
- Max Mathiasin (born 1956), French politician
- Max Melton (born 2002), American football player
- Max Meyer (footballer) (born 1995), German footballer
- Max Meyer-Olbersleben (1850–1927), German composer and pianist
- Max Miller (YouTuber) (born 1983), American YouTuber and amateur historian/chef
- Max Mitchell (born 1999), American football player
- Maxey Dell Moody (1883–1949), American businessman
- Max Moreno (born 1968), Brazilian writer
- Max Morinière (born 1964), French sprinter
- Max von Mühlenen (1903–1971), Swiss painter
- Max Müller (1823–1900), British philologist
- Max Müller (philosopher) (1906–1994), German philosopher
- Max Müller (cross-country skier) (1916–2019), Swiss cross-country skier
- Max Müller (footballer) (born 1994), German footballer
- Max Müller (Danish army officer) (1808–1884), Danish military officer
- Max Ritter von Müller (1887–1918), German flying ace
- Max Muncy (born 1990), American Major League Baseball player

=== N ===
- Max Nacewicz (born 1993), American football player
- Max Nagl (born 1987), German motorcycle racer
- Max Nagy (born 1999), English rugby union player
- Max Narváez (born 1957), Paraguayan judoka
- Max Näther (1899–1919), German World War I flying ace
- Max Naumann (1875–1939), German Jewish politician
- Max Nauta (1896–1957), Dutch painter
- Max Neal (1865–1941), German playwright
- Max Nemetz (1886–1971), German actor
- Max Nemni (1935–2024), Canadian political scientist and writer
- Max Nettlau (1865–1944), German anarchist and historian
- Max Neuburger (1868–1955), Austrian medical historian
- Max Neufeld (1887–1967), Austrian film director
- Max Neuhaus (1939–2009), American musician
- Max Neukirchner (born 1983), German motorcycle racer
- Max von Neumayr (1808–1881), German administrative lawyer and parliamentarian
- Max Neville (born 2000), Irish cricketer
- Max Newcombe, Australian tennis player
- Max Newman (1897–1984), English mathematician
- Max Nicholson (footballer) (born 1971), English footballer
- Max Nicolson (1917–1997), Australian rules footballer
- Max Niederbacher (1899–1979), German association football player
- Max Niederlag (born 1993), German bicycle racer
- Max Niehaus (1888–1981), German writer and dance researcher
- Max Nijman (1941–2016), Surinamese singer
- Max Nilsson (born 1980), Swedish racing driver
- Max Nivelli (1878–1926), Russian film producer
- Max Nixon (Australian rules footballer) (1931–2019), Australian rules footballer
- Max W. Noah (1932–2018), United States Army general
- Max Noether (1844–1921), German mathematician
- Max Nomad (1881–1973), Austrian-American anarchist
- Max Nonne (1861–1959), German neurologist
- Max Nonnenbruch (1857–1922), German painter
- Max Nord (1916–2008), Dutch journalist, writer, and translator
- Max Nordau (1849–1923), Zionist leader, physician, author, and social critic
- Max Norman, British record producer
- Max Magnus Norman (born 1973), Swedish artist
- Max Northcote-Green (born 1994), English rugby union player
- Max Nosseck (1902–1972), German film director, actor, and screenwriter
- Max Nowlan (1939–2025), Australian rules footballer
- Max Nowry (born 1990), American wrestler

=== O ===
- Max O'Connell (born 1936), Australian cricket umpire
- Max O'Dowd (born 1994), Dutch cricketer
- Max O'Halloran (1952–2026), Australian rules footballer
- Max O'Leary (born 1996), Irish footballer
- Max O'Rell (1848–1903), French journalist
- Max Oates (1942–2019), Australian rules footballer
- Max Obal (1881–1949), German actor, screenwriter, and film director
- Max Oehler (1875–1946), German Army officer
- Max Oelschlaeger (born 1943), American ecological philosopher
- Max Joseph Oertel (1835–1897), German physician
- Max Oesten (1843–1917), German musician
- Max Ohnefalsch-Richter (1850–1917), German art historian and archaeologist
- Max Oidtmann (born 1979), American historian
- Max Ojomoh (born 2000), English rugby union player
- Max González Olaechea (1867–1946), Peruvian doctor, clinician and university professor
- Max Oldmeadow (1924–2013), Australian politician
- Max Olivier-Lacamp (1914–1983), French journalist
- Max Olsson (born 1967), Fijian rugby union footballer
- Max Ophüls (1902–1957), German-French film director
- Max Opitz (1890–1982), German communist politician
- Max von Oppenheim (1860–1946), German lawyer, diplomat, ancient historian, and archaeologist
- Max Oppenheimer (artist) (1885–1954), Austrian painter
- Max Oppy (1924–2008), Australian rules footballer and coach
- Max Orban (1881–1969), Belgian rower
- Max Ordman (1926–2002), South African wrestler
- Max Orr (1931–1955), Australian rules footballer
- Max Orrin (born 1994), English golfer
- Max Ortmann (born 1941), Australian politician
- Max Orville (born 1962), French politician
- Max Osbiston (1914–1981), Australian actor
- Max Oswald (born 1906), Swiss footballer
- Max Otte (born 1964), German-American economist and author
- Max Overgaard (born 1978), Danish cricketer

=== P ===
- Max Park (born 2001), American Rubik's Cube speedsolver
- Max Pauly (1907–1946), German SS concentration camp commandant executed for war crimes
- Max Pechstein (1881–1955), German painter
- Lord Max Percy (born 1990), British financial analyst
- Max Planck (1858–1947), German theoretical physicist and Nobel laureate
- Max Purcell (born 1998), Australian tennis player

=== Q ===
- Max Quackenbush (1928–2020), Canadian ice hockey player
- Max Quanchi (born 1945), Australian scholar
- Max Quedenfeldt (1851–1891), German entomologist
- Max Quinzani (born 1988), American lacrosse player

=== R ===
- Max Reger (1873–1916), German composer, pianist, organist, conductor, and academic teacher
- Max Reinhardt (1873–1943), Austrian-born American theatre and film director, intendant and theatrical producer
- Max Reinhardt (publisher) (1915–2002), British publisher
- Max Reis (chemical engineer) (1927–2014), chemical engineer and President of the Technion – Israel Institute of Technology
- Max Rheinstein (1899–1977), German-American jurist
- Max Rijken (1920-1987), Dutch Indonesian-American politician
- Max Roach (1924–2007), American jazz drummer
- Max Rohn (born 1987), American para-athlete
- Max Rose (born 1986), American soldier and politician
- Max Rosenmann (1944–2008), Brazilian politician, businessman, and attorney
- Max Rudolf (conductor) (1902–1995), German conductor

=== S ===
- Max Saalmüller (1832–1890), Prussian lieutenant colonel and German entomologist
- Max Schäfer (1907–1990), German football player and manager
- Max Schäfer (soldier) (1907–1987), German World War II officer
- Max Scharping (born 1996), American National Football League player
- Max Scheler (1874–1928), German philosopher
- Max Scherzer (born 1984), American baseball pitcher for the Texas Rangers
- Max Scheuer, Austrian 1920s footballer
- Max Schutler (1981–2017), Argentine adult film actor and model
- Max Schmeling (1905–2005), German boxer
- Max Schneider (born 1992), American pop singer-songwriter
- Max Sefrin (1913–2000), East German politician
- Max Seibald (born 1987), American lacrosse player
- Max Seydewitz (1892–1987), German politician
- Max Steinberg (born 1988), American poker player
- Max Steinberg (soldier) (1989–2014), American-Israeli lone IDF soldier killed in the 2014 Gaza War
- Max Steiner (1888–1971), Austrian-American composer and conductor
- Max Stirner (1806–1856), German philosopher
- Max Streibl (1932–1998), German politician
- Max Surban (born 1939), Filipino-Cebuano singer and songwriter

=== T ===
- Max Tooley (born 1998), American football player
- Max Treitel (1890–1942), German painter

=== U ===
- Max Ugrai (born 1995), German basketball player
- Max Uhle (1856–1944), German archaeologist
- Max Uhlemann (1829–1862), German Egyptologist
- Max Uhlig (born 1937), German painter
- Max Ulich (1896–1964), Nazi general
- Max Ullrich (born 1994), Croatian alpine skier
- Max Unger (born 1986), American football player
- Max Unger (musicologist) (1883–1959), German musicologist
- Max Unger (sculptor) (1854–1918), German sculptor
- Max O. Urbahn (1912–1995), German-born American architect
- Max Urban (composer) (1882–1949), Mexican composer
- Max Urban (architect) (1882–1959), Czech architect and filmmaker
- Max Urbini (1924–2004), French footballer, sports journalist, and writer
- Max Urick (1940–2025), American football coach and college athletics administrator
- Max Urquhart (born 1942), Australian rules footballer
- Max Uth (1863–1914), German painter

=== V ===
- Max Vadukul (born 1961), British photographer
- Max Valentiner (1883-1949), WW1 German U-boat commander
- Max Wolf Valerio (born 1957), American poet and writer
- Max Valier (1895–1930), Austrian rocketry pioneer
- Max Valiquette (born 1973), Canadian television host
- Max Valles (born 1994), American football player
- Max Vangeli (born 1985), Moldavian DJ
- Max Varnel (1925–1996), French film director
- Max Vartuli (born 2005), Australian footballer
- Max Vasmer (1886–1962), Russian-German linguist
- Max Vatanen (born 1990), Finnish rally driver
- Max de Vaucorbeil (1901–1982), Belgian film director
- Max Vekich, American politician and labor leader
- Max Velmans, British psychologist
- Max Veloso (born 1992), Swiss footballer
- Max Velthuijs (1923–2005), Dutch painter, illustrator and writer
- Max Venable (born 1957), American baseball player
- Max Vernon (born 1988), American performer, songwriter, and playwright
- Max Vernon (police officer) (1936–2021), British constable
- Max Véronneau (born 1995), Canadian ice hockey player
- Max Le Verrier (1891–1973), French sculptor
- Max Verstappen (born 1997), Dutch and Belgian racing driver
- Max Verworn (1863–1921), German physiologist
- Max Vetter (1892–1917), German rower
- Max Vieri (born 1978), Australian soccer player
- Max Viinioksa (1905–1977), Finnish footballer
- Max Villalobos (born 1928), Costa Rican footballer
- Max Van Ville (born 1987), German-American actor
- Max Vincent (1967–2004), Serbian musician
- Max Vogrich (1852–1916), Austrian pianist and composer
- Max Volkhart (1848–1924), German painter
- Max Volmer (1885–1965), German physical chemist
- Max Volume, American musician and radio host
- Max Vorspan (1916–2002), American rabbi and historian

=== W ===
- Max de Waal (born 2002), Dutch footballer
- Max Waechter (1837–1924), German-British businessman and philanthropist
- Max Joseph Wagenbauer (1774–1829), German painter
- Max Wagenknecht (1857–1922), German composer
- Max Wagner (1901–1975), Mexican actor
- Max Wagner (baseball) (born 2001), American baseball player
- Max Leopold Wagner (1880–1962), German philologist and ethnologist
- Max Waibel (1901–1971), Swiss soldier
- Max Waldau (1825–1855), German writer
- Max Freiherr von Waldberg (1858–1938), German professor
- Max Waldman (1919–1981), American photographer
- Max Waldmeier (1912–2000), Swiss astronomer
- Max Walef (born 1993), Brazilian footballer
- Max Walker-Silverman (born 1993), American director
- Max Walker (1948–2016), Australian rules footballer and cricketer
- Max Walker (cyclist) (born 2001), British cyclist
- Max Wall (1908–1990), English actor and music hall artist
- Max Wallace (born 1960), Canadian journalist
- Max Waller (born 1988), English cricketer
- Max Waller (writer) (1860–1889), Belgian poet, critic, novelist and playwright
- Max Wallner (1891–1951), German operetta librettist and screenwriter
- Max Wallraf (1859–1941), German politician
- Max Walscheid (born 1993), German cyclist
- Max Walsh (1937–2022), Australian journalist and company director
- Max Walter (1899–1940), Slovak chess master
- Max Walter (weightlifter) (1905–1987), German weightlifter
- Max Walters (1920–2005), English botanist and conscientious objector
- Max Wandrer (1894–1978), American gymnast
- Max Wanner (born 2003), Canadian ice hockey player
- Max Warburg (1867–1946), Jewish banker
- Max Ward (drummer) (born 1973), American musician
- Max Ward (aviator) (1921–2020), Canadian aviator
- Max de Wardener (born 1972), British composer
- Max Warmerdam (born 2000), Dutch chess grandmaster
- Max Wärn (born 1988), Finnish ice hockey player
- Max Warner, American football player and coach
- Max Warren (born 1993), Australian rules footballer
- Max Alexander Cunningham Warren (1904–1977), Irish Anglican missionary
- Max Peiffer Watenphul (1896–1976), German painter
- Max Watman (born 1971), American author
- Max Watson (born 1996), Swedish footballer
- Max Watters (born 1999), English footballer
- Max Webb (1917–2018), Polish-born American real estate developer and philanthropist
- Max Weber (1864–1920), German social scientist
- Max Weber (artist) (1881–1961), Jewish-American painter
- Max Weber Sr. (1836–1897), German lawyer and politician
- Max Weber (Swiss politician) (1951–1954), Swiss Federal Councilor
- Max Weber (general) (1824–1901), German American military officer, hotelier and tax collector
- Max Weber (race walker) (1922–2007), East German racewalker
- Max Weber (cyclist) (born 1964), German paralympic cyclist
- Max Carl Wilhelm Weber (1852–1937), German-Dutch zoologist and biogeographer
- Max Maria von Weber (1822–1881), German civil engineer
- Max Wechsler (cyclist) (1938–1978), Swiss cyclist
- Max Wechsler (1925-2020), French abstract artist
- Max Weekers (born 1997), Dutch kickboxer
- Max van Weezel (1951–2019), Dutch journalist and politician
- Max Wegner (born 1989), German footballer
- Max Wegner (businessman) (born 1987), German businessman
- Max Wehrli (1909–1998), Swiss literary scholar and Germanist
- Max Wehrli (athlete) (1930–2014), Swiss decathlete
- Max Weil (1869–1944), American violinist, conductor, composer and music educator
- Max Weiler (1900-1969), Swiss footballer and manager
- Max Weiler (artist) (1910–2001), Austrian painter
- Max Weinberg (born 1951), American drummer, member of the E Street Band
- Max Weinhold (born 1982), German field hockey player
- Max Weinreich (1894–1969), American linguist
- Max Bernhard Weinstein (1852–1918), German physicist and philosopher
- Max Weir, American baseball coach
- Max Weisel (born 1991), American entrepreneur and artist
- Max Weiss (scholar), American scholar and translator
- Max Weiss (activist), American Communist activist and writer
- Max Weiß (footballer) (born 2004), German footballer
- Max Weißkirchen (born 1996), German badminton player
- Max Weitzenhoffer (born 1939), American producer
- Max Wellborn (1862–1957), American politician
- Max Welling (born 1968), Dutch computer scientist
- Max Welti (born 1952), Swiss racing driver
- Max Wenkel (1864–1944), German automobile pioneer
- Max Wenn (1926–2008), Australian rules footballer
- Max Wenner (1887–1937), British man who died mysteriously in 1937
- Max Wentscher (1862–1942), German philosopher
- Max Werner (1953–2024), Dutch musician
- Max Wertheimer (1880–1943), Austro-Hungarian psychologist
- Max West (1916–2003), American baseball player
- Max West (1920s outfielder) (1904–1971), American baseball player
- Max Westenhöfer (1871–1957), German pathologist and biologist
- Max Westerkamp (1912–1970), Dutch field hockey player
- Max Westermaier (1852–1903), German botanist
- Max Westphal (born 2003), French tennis player
- Max Wexler (1870–1917), Romanian socialist activist and journalist
- Max Weyl (1837–1914), American painter
- Max Wheeler (footballer) (1912–1941), Australian rules footballer
- Max Wheeler (linguist) (born 1946), British linguist
- Max White (politician), Canadian politician
- Max White (rugby union) (1908–1979), Australian rugby union player
- Max Whitehead (1922–2010), Australian rugby league footballer
- Max Whitlock (born 1993), English artistic gymnast
- Max Whittier (1867–1925), American businessman
- Max Ernst Wichura (1817–1866), German lawyer and botanist
- Max Wickert (born 1938), American poet
- Max Wideman (1927–2026), British civil engineer
- Max Widmer (1933–2010), Swiss wrestler
- Max von Widnmann (1812–1895), German sculptor and professor
- Max Wieczorek (1939–2023), Canadian rower
- Max Wielen (born 1883), German Kripo official
- Max Wien (1866–1938), German physicist
- Max Wilcox (1928–2017), American record producer
- Max Wilhelm (1884–1954), German trade union leader
- Max Wilk (1920–2011), American writer
- Max Wilkinson (born 1984), British politician
- Max Wilks (1936–2023), American politician
- Max Williams (basketball) (1938–2025), American basketball coach
- Max Williams (actor), Canadian film and television actor
- Max Williams (rugby union) (born 1998), Welsh rugby union footballer
- Max Williams (politician) (born 1963), American politician
- Max Normann Williamsen (born 2003), Norwegian footballer
- Max Williamson (born 2002), Scottish rugby union player
- Max Willis (1935–2021), Australian politician
- Max Willman (born 1995), American ice hockey player
- Max Wilms (1867–1918), German pathologist and surgeon
- Max Wilson (racing driver) (born 1972), Brazilian racing driver
- Max Wilson (baseball) (1916–1977), American baseball player
- Max Wilson (footballer) (born 2007), English-Northern Irish footballer
- Max Wiltshire (1938–2021), Welsh rugby union player
- Max Windmüller (1920–1945), German member of the Dutch resistance in World War II
- Max Winkler (director) (born 1983), American director and screenwriter
- Max Winkler (1875–1961), German politician
- Max Winter (1903–1996), American sports executive
- Max Winter (politician) (1870–1937), Austrian journalist and politician
- Max Wintermark (born 1973), Swiss and American neuroradiologist
- Max Wirestone, American author and librarian
- Max Wirth (1822–1900), German journalist and economist
- Max Wise (born 1975), American educator and Republican politician
- Max Wiskandt (born 2002), German tennis player
- Max Wissel (born 1989), German racing driver
- Max Wittek (born 1993), American football player
- Max Wiznitzer, American neurologist
- Max Wohlberg (1907–1996), Hungarian-American hazzan, composer, and scholar
- Max Woiski Sr. (1911–1981), Surinamese musician
- Max Woiski Jr. (1930–2011), Surinamese singer and guitarist
- Max Wolf (1863–1932), German astrophotography pioneer
- Max Wolf (composer) (1840–1886), Austrian composer
- Max Wolf (gymnast), American gymnast
- Max Wolff (soldier) (1912–1945), Brazilian Army soldier
- Max Wolff (physician) (1844–1923), German physician
- Max Wolfley, American politician
- Max Woltman (born 2003), English footballer
- Max Wood (born 2004), English professional rugby league footballer
- Max A. Woodbury (1917–2010), American mathematician
- Max Lutje Wooldrik, Dutch businessman
- Max Woosnam (1892–1965), English football and tennis player
- Max Wosniak (1926–2023), Polish-American soccer player and coach
- Max Arie Wotulo (1932–2000), Indonesian chess player
- Max Wright (1943–2019), American actor
- Max Wright (English footballer) (born 1998), English footballer
- Max Wright (rugby union) (born 1997), English rugby union player
- Max Wright (Australian footballer) (1901–1988), Australian rules footballer
- Max Wünsche (1914–1995), SS officer
- Max Wünschig (born 1950), German tennis player
- Max Wykes-Joyce (1924–2002), British literary and art critic
- Max Wyman (1916–1991), Canadian mathematician and academic administrator

=== Y ===
- Max Yalden (1930–2015), Canadian diplomat
- Max Yankowitz (1875–1945), American klezmer accordionist and recording artist
- Max Yanto (born 1983), Indonesian basketball player
- Max Yasgur (1919–1973), American farmer
- Max Yates (politician), American politician
- Max Yates (American football) (born 1979), American football player
- Max Yavno (1911–1985), American photographer
- Max Yergan (1892–1975), American activist
- Max Yoho (1934–2017), American novelist
- Max E. Youngstein (1913–1997), American film producer

=== Z ===
- Max Zachem (born 1992), American racing driver
- Max Zähle, German filmmaker
- Max Zaritsky (1885–1959), American labor leader
- Max Zaslofsky (1925–1985), American basketball player and coach
- Max Zendejas (born 1963), Mexican gridiron football player
- Max Zerwick (1901–1975), German Jesuit
- Max Zilzer (1868–1943), German actor
- Max Zimmering (1909–1973), German writer, journalist and politician
- Max Zimmermann (1811–1878), German painter and lithographer
- Max Zimmermann (gridiron football) (born 1994), German gridiron football player
- Max Zorn (artist), Dutch artist
- Max August Zorn (1906–1993), German mathematician
- Max Zutt (born 1880), Swiss footballer
- Max Zwerbach (1884–1908), American gangster

== Fictional characters ==
- Max, in the Fox TV series 24
- Max, in the British animated children's TV series Thomas & Friends
- Max (Comet Man), an alien character featured in Marvel Comics
- Max, in the Pokémon anime series
- Max Branning, in the BBC TV series EastEnders
- Max Caulfield, in the 2015 video game Life Is Strange
- Max Cooper, in the TV series Power Rangers Wild Force
- Max Gibson, in the animated series Batman Beyond
- Max Goof, the son of the Disney character Goofy
- Max Guevara, in the TV series Dark Angel
- Max Headroom (character), a 1980s TV character
- Max King (Emmerdale), in the TV series Emmerdale
- Max Mayfield, in the Netflix TV series Stranger Things
- Max Modell, Marvel Comics character
- Max Payne (character), in the video game series Max Payne and its film adaptation
- Max Rebo, in Star Wars
- Max Ride, in the Maximum Ride book series
- Max Rockatansky, in the Mad Max films
- Max Russo, in the TV series Wizards of Waverly Place
- Max Smart, in the 1995 version of the TV series Get Smart
- Max Steel in the Max Steel franchise
- Max Tate in the anime/manga series Beyblade
- Max Tennyson, in Cartoon Network's Ben 10 franchise
- Max Thunderman, in the Nickelodeon TV series The Thundermans
- Max Zorin, in the James Bond film A View to a Kill
- Uncle Max, in the 2004 animated film The Lion King 1½

== See also ==
- Max (disambiguation)
- Max (surname)
