= Waldmeier =

Waldmeier (German: Walmeier, Yiddish: וואַלדמאַיער, Hebrew: וולדמאייר) is a surname of Swiss, German and Jewish (western Ashkenazic) origin meaning "Forest Mayor". This surname is often associated with a person who lived around a forest, or owned and maintained land with a forest on it. Notable people with the surname include:

- Marie-Luce Waldmeier (born 1960), French alpine skier
- Max Waldmeier (1912–2000), Swiss astronomer
- Theophilus Waldmeier (1832–1915), Swiss Quaker missionary
