= Maxine (given name) =

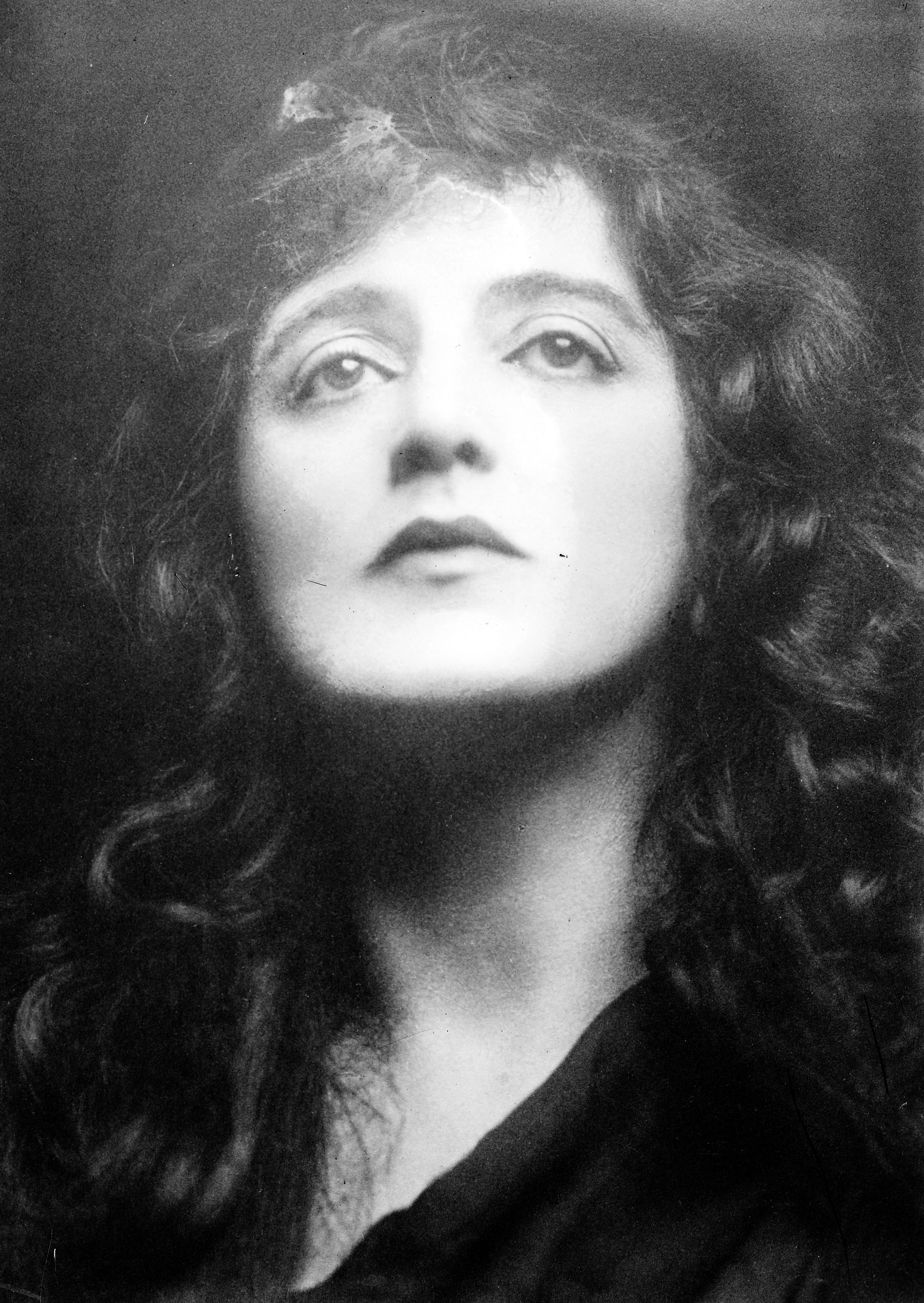
- Actress Maxine Elliott (1868–1940) was an early influence on the popularity of the name Maxine.
- Pronunciation: English: /ˈmæksiːn/, max-EEN
- Gender: Feminine
- Language: English

Origin
- Meaning: Feminine version of Max

Other names
- Related names: Max, Maxen, Maxence, Maxene, Maxfield, Maxi, Maxie, Maxim, Maxima, Maxime, Maximilian, Maximiliana, Maximiliano, Maximina, Maximino, Maximo, Maximus, Maxon, Maxson, Maxton, Maxwell, Maxx, Maxxine

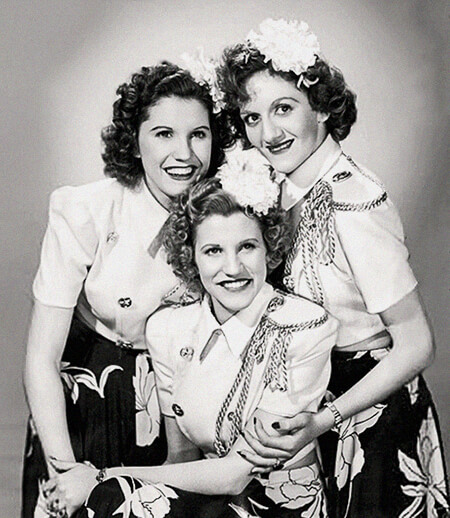
Maxene Andrews (1916–1995), top left, with sisters LaVerne, top right, and Patty, center, performed as the popular singing trio The Andrews Sisters.

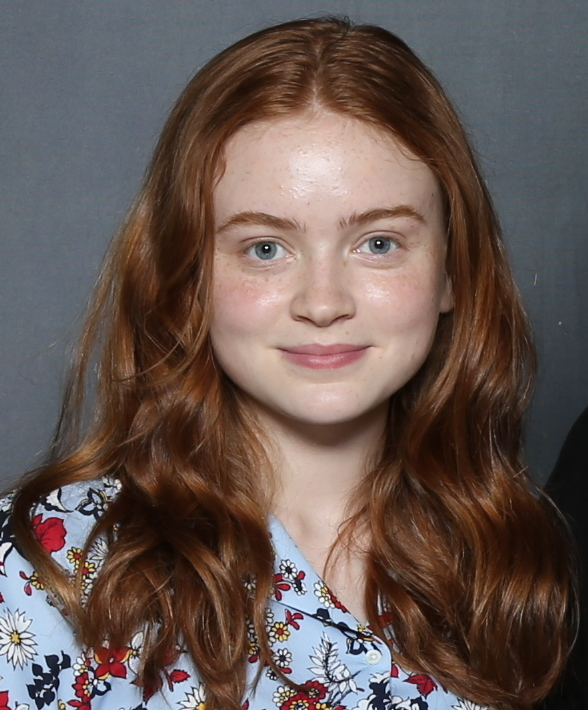
Actress Sadie Sink portrayed Maxine "Max" Mayfield in the streaming series Stranger Things.

Maxine is an English feminine given name created as a feminine version of the name Max.

It has been in regular use since the 1880s. Other names with the diminutive suffix -een, -ene, or -ine were also in fashion during the late 19th century and early 20th century.

The increase in usage of the name in the 1890s has been attributed to the popularity of American actress Maxine Elliott, who was born Jessie Dermot. Another early media influence was Maxene Andrews of The Andrews Sisters singing trio. The influence of the Stranger Things character Max Mayfield is partially associated with the increase in popularity of the name since 2017.

== Usage ==
The name first ranked among the top 1,000 names in use for newborn girls in the United States in 1884. It was among the top 1,000 names between 1893 and 1975, in 1978, in 1988, between 1991 and 1994, in 1996, and between 2016 and 2022. It was at the height of popularity between 1915 and 1930, when it ranked among the top 100 names for American girls. It has also been in occasional use elsewhere in the Anglosphere such as Australia, Canada, New Zealand and the United Kingdom. It has been among the top 500 names in use for girls in France since 2010 and among the top 100 names for girls in Belgium since 2017.

== People ==
- Maxene Andrews (1916–1995), member of The Andrews Sisters singing trio
- Maxine Audley (1923–1992), English actress
- Maxine Brown (country singer) (1932–2019), American country music singer
- Maxine Brown (soul singer) (born 1939), American soul and R&B singer
- Maxine D. Brown, American computer scientist
- Maxine Carr, convicted of perverting the course of justice in relation to the Soham murders (not to be confused with Maxine Moore Carr / Maxine Waters)
- Maxine Dexter (1972), American politician
- Maxine Elliott (1868–1940), American actress
- Maxine Fassberg (born 1953), CEO, Intel Israel
- Maxine Fleming, New Zealand television screenwriter and producer
- Maxine Funke, New Zealand singer-songwriter
- Maxine Hong Kingston (born 1940), Chinese American author and Professor Emerita
- Maxine Jones (born 1962), American singer, member of girl group En Vogue
- Maxine Kumin (1925–2014), American poet and author
- Maxine Mawhinney (born 1957), newsreader on the BBC News 24-hour television channel
- Maxine McKew (born 1953), Australian politician and journalist
- Maxine Medina (born 1990), Filipino model, beauty pageant titleholder, Miss Universe Philippines 2016, and top 6 Miss Universe 2016
- Maxine "Blossom" Miles (1901–1984), British aviator
- Maxine Nightingale (born 1952), British R&B and soul music singer
- Maxine Peake (born 1974), English actress
- Maxine Reiner (1916–2003), American actress
- Maxine Sanders (born 1946), British Wiccan
- Maxine Sullivan (born Marietta Williams, 1911–1987), American jazz vocalist/performer
- Maxine Waters (born Maxine Moore Carr, born 1938), American politician
- Maxine (wrestler) (born 1986), stage name of American former professional wrestler, model, and former WWE Diva Karlee Pérez

=== Fictional characters ===
- Maxine Baker, daughter of Animal Man (Buddy Baker) in DC Comics
- Maxine Baker, from the American comedy-drama series Ginny & Georgia
- Maxine Barlow, from the British drama series Waterloo Road
- Maxine Black, "Max", titular protagonist of the American television sitcom 2 broke girls
- Max Caulfield, or Maxine, main character in the video game Life Is Strange
- Maxine Chadway, from the television series Soul Food
- Maxine Conway, from the Australian drama series, Wentworth
- Maxine Gray, from the American television series, Judging Amy
- Maxine Guevara, main character of the American TV series Dark Angel
- Maxine Mayfield, "Max" or "Madmax", on the Netflix series Stranger Things
- Maxine Minniver, from the British soap opera, Hollyoaks
- Maxine Minx, from the horror films X and MaXXXine
- Maxine Peacock, from the British soap opera, Coronation Street
- Maxine Shaw, from the American television sitcom Living Single
- Maxine Tarnow, main character in Thomas Pynchon's novel Bleeding Edge
- Maxine (Hallmark), character in greeting card images
