= Pro multis =

Latin phrase

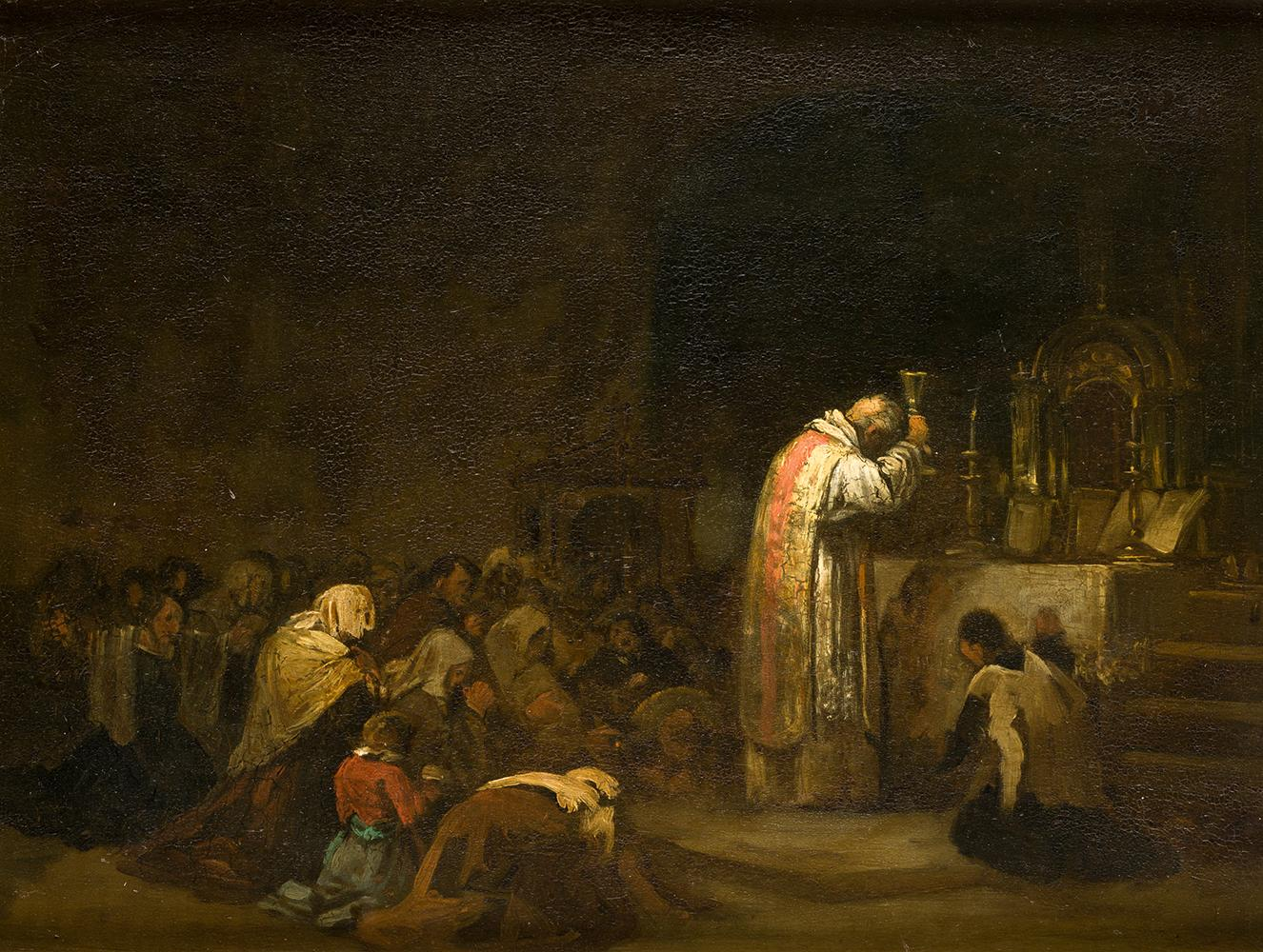
Eugenio Lucas Velázquez's "The Elevation" shows a Catholic priest performing the consecration of the wine.

Pro multis is a Latin phrase that means "for many" or "for the many". Not having the definite article, Latin does not distinguish between these two meanings.

The phrase is part of the longer phrase "qui pro vobis et pro multis effundetur in remissionem peccatorum" used, with reference to the blood of Christ, in the consecration of the wine in the Roman Rite Mass.

In the definitively approved English translation this longer phrase appears as "which will be poured out for you and for many for the forgiveness of sins".

The phrase "poured out for you" comes from Luke 22:20 only. "Poured out for many" is from Matthew 26:28 and Mark 14:24. "For the forgiveness of sins" is from Matthew 26:28 only. 1 Corinthians 11:25, the earliest account of Jesus' words over the cup at his Last Supper, mentions none of these phrases in relation to the consecration of the wine.

The variety of these accounts indicates that the writers did not intend to give the exact words that Jesus used, probably in Aramaic. The only words that are considered essential for the consecration of the wine at Mass are "This is my blood", though the form of the sacrament, which varies according to the liturgical rite (Roman Rite, Byzantine Rite, etc.) contains other words as well.

Biblicist Albert Vanhoye said that Hebrew רבים (rabbim), translated in Greek as πολλῶν (pollon) "means 'a great number' without any specification as to whether this refers to a totality".

== Translation as "for all" ==
Several initial vernacular translations of the Roman Missal employed "for all" instead of "for many" to represent the phrase pro multis in the Eucharistic Prayer. Thus, Italian had "per tutti", Spanish "por todos los hombres", Portuguese "por todos os homens", German "für alle". However, languages such as Polish translated literally "za was i za wielu", while Dutch had "voor de velen" (for the many), and French "pour la multitude" (for the multitude).

The word "many" (Latin multi, Greek πολλοί) is opposed to "few" (Latin pauci, Greek ὀλίγοι), not to "all" (Latin omnes, Greek πάντες). In a large group, all the members are many; in a small group, all are few. People can be many whether they form the totality of a group or only part of a group. An article by Father Max Zerwick, S.J. gives examples of texts in which the totality of a group are referred to as "many".

In 2006, the Holy See gave instructions that in vernacular translations of the revised edition of the Roman Missal published in 2002, pro multis was to be translated literally, as "for many". In a circular of 17 October of that year, the Congregation for Divine Worship and the Discipline of the Sacraments pointed out that "for all" is not a literal translation of "pro multis", nor of the words "περὶ πολλῶν" in Matthew 26:28 or "ὑπὲρ πολλῶν" in Mark 14:24. "For all", it said, is not so much a translation as "an explanation of the sort that belongs properly to catechesis". Accordingly, it directed the episcopal conferences to make an effort, in line with the Instruction Liturgiam authenticam, to translate the words pro multis "more faithfully".

The official English translation of the 2002 edition of the Roman Missal has been issued, but work continues for several other languages. The new Spanish version has already been approved, with "por muchos" (for many) replacing the previous "por todos los hombres" (for all men), and as early as Pentecost 2009 the change was effected in Hungary from "mindenkiért" (for all) to "sokakért" (for many); but reluctance in some quarters to abandon the use of "for all" to represent pro multis has caused delay in relation to German and Italian.

In view of the resistance of some German-speaking episcopal conferences, Pope Benedict XVI wrote a personal letter on 14 April 2012 to the German conference, which had accepted the change. In it he stressed the importance of using the literal translation.

The Italian bishops conference also voted against translating pro multis literally as "per molti" (for many), and in favour of keeping "per tutti" (for all). In 2012, Biblicist Francesco Pieri proposed using the phrase "per una moltitudine" (for a multitude) as a way of being faithful to the Latin original.

=== 1973 English translation ===
In its initial translation of the Order of Mass, the International Commission on English in the Liturgy rendered the phrase "qui pro vobis et pro multis effundetur in remissionem peccatorum" as "which will be shed for you and for all men, so that sins may be forgiven". (The word "men" was later omitted because of complaints that it could be understood as referring only to males.) This version was approved by the Episcopal Conferences of English-speaking countries in 1973 and confirmed by the Holy See. It has now been replaced by a more accurate translation.

The 1973 translation was confessedly a non-literal translation, and objections were raised against it not only for this reason but also on the grounds that it could be taken to mean that all are in fact saved, regardless of their relationship to Christ and his Church. Some even claimed that use of the "for all" translation made the consecration invalid.

As mentioned in the introduction, Biblicist Albert Vanhoye stated that "pollon" does not exclude the meaning "all" and consequently the English word "many" is not an accurate translation as it excludes "all".

In defence of the 1973 translation, it was said that the literal translation, "for many", could nowadays be taken to mean "not for all", contradicting the declaration in 2 Corinthians 5:14–15 that Christ died for all, though not all choose to avail of the redemption won for them by the shedding of Christ's blood.

== Translation as "for the many" ==
The Dutch bishops chose to translate pro multis as "voor de velen" (for the many). The German Bishops Conference also initially decided to translate pro multis as "für die Vielen" (for the many), which was to be explained in catechesis as meaning "for all"; however, under the influence of a movement that began in Italy and spread to other countries, they then decided in 1968 to adopt instead "für alle" (for all). The French conference used "pour la multitude" (for the multitude), but the Italian Bishops Conference has rejected this expression for use in the Mass in Italian.

"For many", rather than "for all" or "for the many", is now the official translation in English. The Holy See is insisting on the same for the German translation, with Pope Benedict XVI pointing out that "neither Matthew nor Mark uses the definite article, so it is not 'for the many', but 'for many'".

In fact, the Latin liturgical phrase pro multis is drawn from Matthew 26:28, which in the original Greek reads περὶ πολλῶν (peri pollon), the form used in the Byzantine Greek liturgy, and from Mark 14:24, which in the original Greek reads ὑπὲρ πολλῶν (hyper pollon). Unlike Latin, Greek has the definite article, which appears in neither passage. "For many", not "for the many", is also how all English translations of the Bible translate these phrases. In the view of Manfred Hauke, use in the liturgy of "for the many" would be "a shabby compromise".

Hebrew רבים (rabbim), translated in Greek as πολλῶν (pollon), "means 'a great number' without any specification as to whether this refers to a totality". This also is without the article: רבים (rabbim), not הרבים (harabbim).

== For whom was Christ's blood shed? ==
In the Apostolic Constitution Cum occasione of 31 May 1653 Pope Innocent X declared that it is orthodox Catholic teaching to say that Christ shed his blood for all human beings without exception. Indeed, the traditional blessing of a Paten found in the Pontificale Romanum includes the phrase, "Jesus Christ Thy Son, Who for our salvation, and of everyone, (pro nostra omniumque salute) chose to immolate Himself to Thee, God the Father, on the gallows of the Cross."

It is also orthodox Catholic teaching that not all will necessarily avail of the redemption obtained by the shedding of Christ's blood. While Christ's redemptive suffering makes salvation available to all, it does not follow that all men are actually saved. This seems never to have been authoritatively defined, since it has remained uncontroversial.

The Roman Catechism, also known as the Catechism of the Council of Trent, stated: "If we look to its value, we must confess that the Redeemer shed his blood for the salvation of all; but if we look to the fruit which mankind have received from it, we shall easily find that it pertains not unto all, but to many of the human race."

It would be heretical to interpret "for many" in the words of consecration of the wine as indicating that there were some for whom the shedding of Christ's blood was in itself incapable of redeeming (its value). So the Roman Catechism interpreted "for many" in the context of the consecration form as referring to the effect actually accepted by individuals (its fruits). It declared: "When therefore (our Lord) said: 'For you', he meant either those who were present, or those chosen from among the Jewish people, such as were, with the exception of Judas, the disciples with whom he was speaking. When he added, 'And for many', he wished to be understood to mean the remainder of the elect from among the Jews or Gentiles."

In this, the Roman Catechism differed somewhat from the Summa Theologica of Saint Thomas Aquinas. This interpreted "for you" as a reference either to the elect among the Jews, who witnessed the blood shed in the Old Testament sacrifices, or to the priest and the faithful partaking of Mass; and it took "for many" to refer either to the elect among the Gentiles, or to those for whom Mass is offered.

The Catechism went on to say with regard to the words used in the Roman Canon: "With reason, therefore, were the words 'for all' not used, as in this place the fruits of the Passion are alone spoken of, and to the elect only did His Passion bring the fruit of salvation. And this is the purport of the Apostle when he says: 'Christ was offered once to exhaust the sins of many'; and also of the words of our Lord in John: 'I pray for them; I pray not for the world, but for them whom thou hast given me, because they are thine'."

It would also be heretical to interpret "for all" in the words of consecration of the wine as indicating that, without any exception, everybody must in concrete fact receive the benefit won by the shedding of Christ's blood. So the Holy See has interpreted "for all" in the 1973 English translation of the consecration form as referring to the value of the shedding of Christ's blood and to his intention. On 25 January 1974, the Congregation for the Doctrine of the Faith declared that there was no doubt whatsoever regarding the validity of Masses celebrated using "for all" as a translation of "pro multis", since "for all" corresponds to a correct interpretation of Christ's intention expressed in the words of the consecration, and since it is a dogma of the Catholic faith that Christ died on the Cross for all (cf. John 11:52, 2 Corinthians 5:14–15, Titus 2:11, 1 John 2:2).
