= Amphibious cycle =

Pedal-powered vehicle capable of operation on both land and water

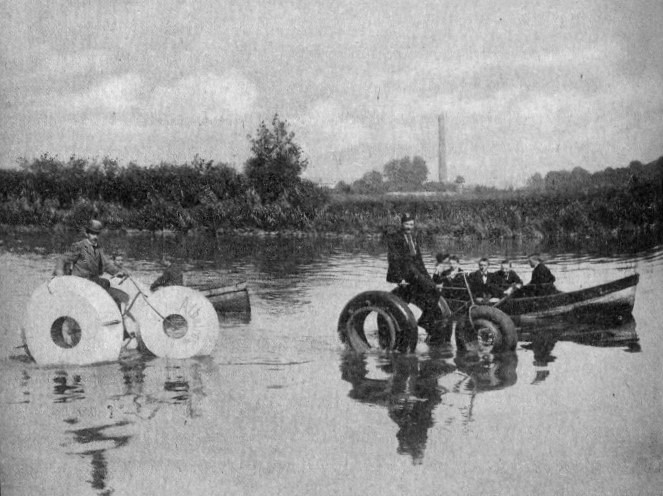
Wenkels water tricycle 1895

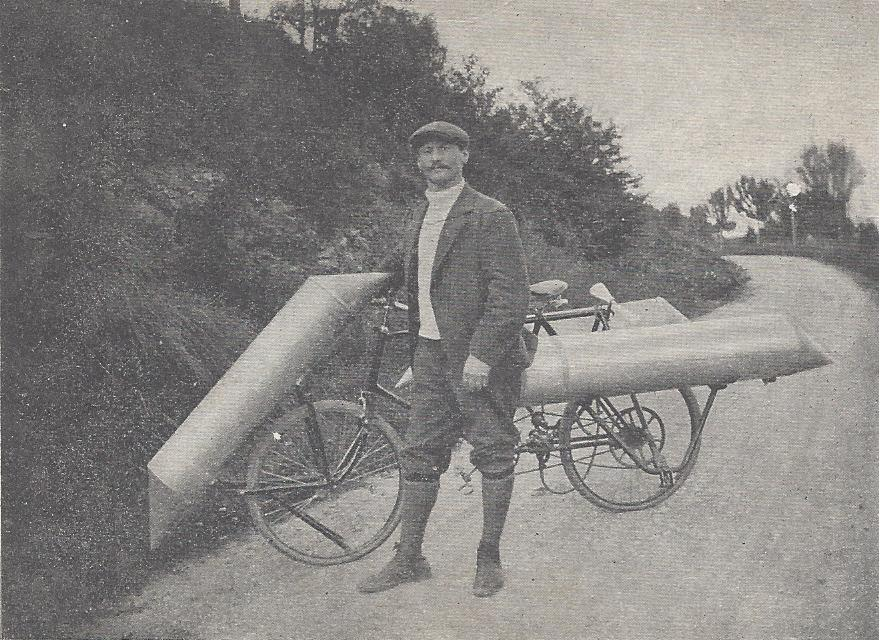
Water bicycle by Baumgartner and Hirth about 1910

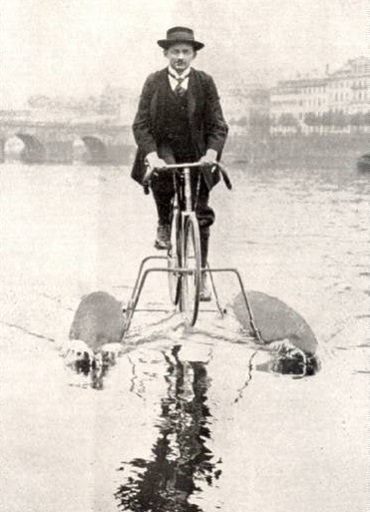
Water bicycle by Julius Bettinger about 1915

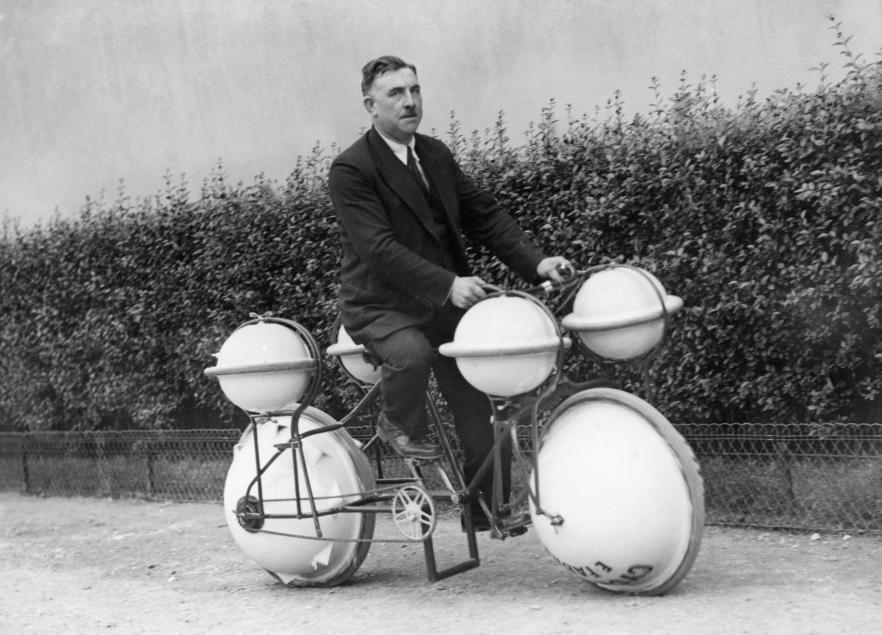
Amphibious bike 'Cyclomer', Paris, 1932

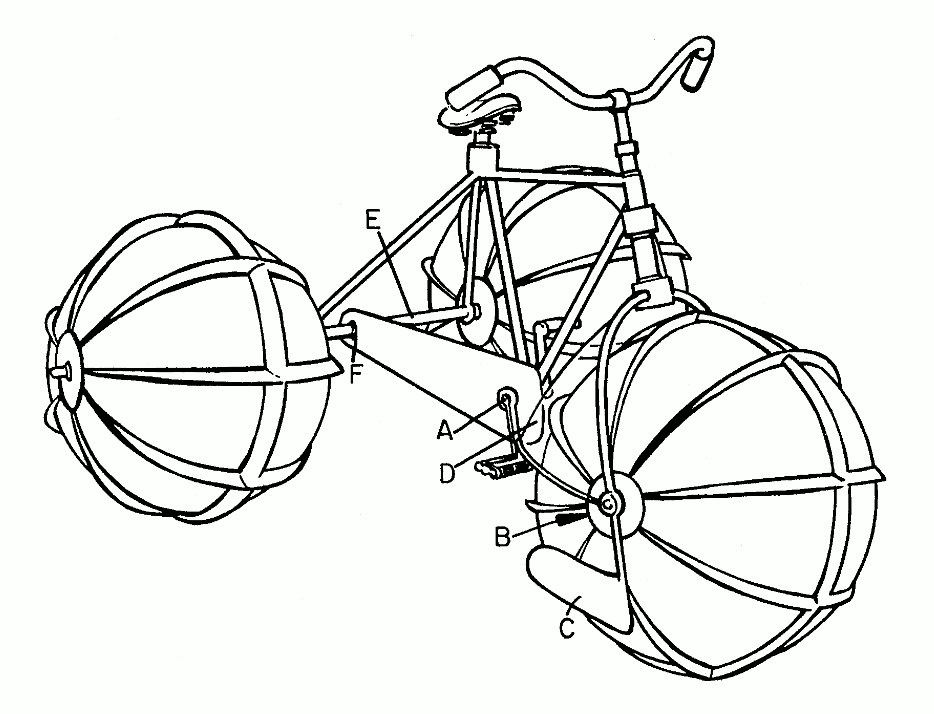
Patent drawing of 'Ciclo Amphibious', 1971

An amphibious cycle is a human-powered vehicle capable of operation on both land and water. Some designs allow riding directly into and out of the water, other semi-amphibious cycles must be converted in order to change from one mode to the other.

== Early designs ==
First designs and patent applications appeared in the late 1860s for amphibious tricycles using large buoyant wheels and thus able to be driven directly in and out of the water. In 1869 the American David Farmer patented (US Patent 92807) a lever-operated Land & Water Velocipede.

In the 1880s and 1890s several designs and vehicles appeared such as the Belgian engineers Cooman tricycle with buoyant wheels in 1883. In the same year Englishman William Terry rode his quite different semi-amphibious tricycle from London to Saint Denis, with Paris as the original goal, successfully crossing the channel in 8 hours and riding the first 58 miles to Canterbury in 13 hours. The tricycle had two large front wheels made of two sections each. These formed the framework of a folding rowing boat 3.6 m long and 1.2 m wide, the conversion taking a half-hour.

George Pinkert of Munich patented (US Patent 463283) his tricycle with large buoyant wheels in 1891. The two driven rear wheels were fitted with ribs as paddle wheels. In 1894 Pinkert attempted to cross the English Channel and made it half-way.

In 1895 the German engineer Max Wenkel experimented successfully with water tricycles near Hannover. The two rear wheels were fitted with small paddles for water propulsion.

In 1896 Thore J. Olsen of Chicago demonstrated his Water and Land Vehicle. The tricycle with two large driven rear wheels had paddles attached and supported a catamaran between them, with the steered front wheel between them. It could be ridden directly into the water with the rider's feet remaining dry.

In 1943 David Vigo, in 1963 Harry Leiberman and in 1971 Ernesto Moraga were awarded US-patents 2,323.261, 3,091,209 and 3,606,856 for their water tricycles. These had been preceded in 1903 by Anton Piller with US patent 728,758 for a similar water quadracycle, and other designs using buoyant ball wheels around since the 1860s.

A similar two-wheeler, E. Fabri's Cyclomer, was demonstrated in Paris in 1932. As the dynamic stability of a road bicycle does not work on the water, four additional stabilizing ball wheels were fitted that are folded down on the water.

Other semi-amphibious bicycles were constructed using fully roadworthy safety bicycles. The first known such design was developed in 1910 by Baumgartner and Hirth and demonstrated on the Rhine. In water mode three floats are folded down and a propeller drive connected.

In 1915 Julius Bettinger patented and demonstrated a semi-amphibious bicycle on the Neckar using two inflatable floats. It was propelled by paddles connected with levers to the pedals. In 1948 Leopold Fuska and in 1950 Alfred and Otto Zacke were granted patents for similar semi-amphibious inflatable bicycle-catamarans but using proplellers. The former used a rear rudder worked by cables to the front wheel, the latter used a front rudder attached directly to the front wheel.

In 1950 Kurt Lipski was awarded patent DE815307C for a trailable foldable catamaran for a tandem bicycle. For on the water it was unfolded, the trailer and bicycle wheels removed, the tandem attached and its chain connected to a pair of water wheels and a rear rudder attached.

== Contemporary designs ==
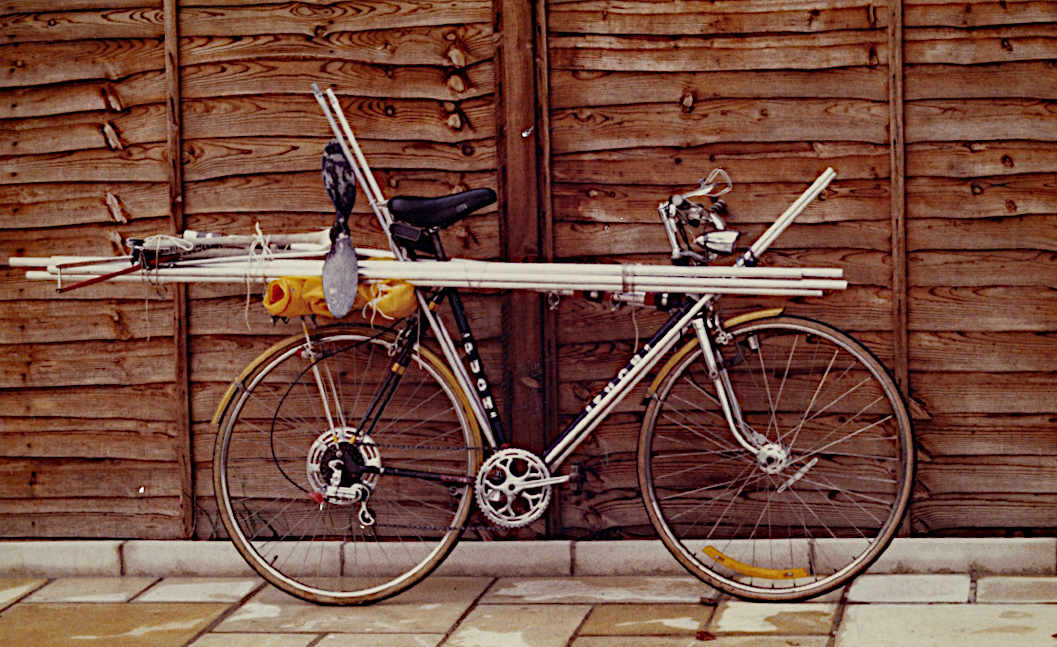
Amphiped in road mode

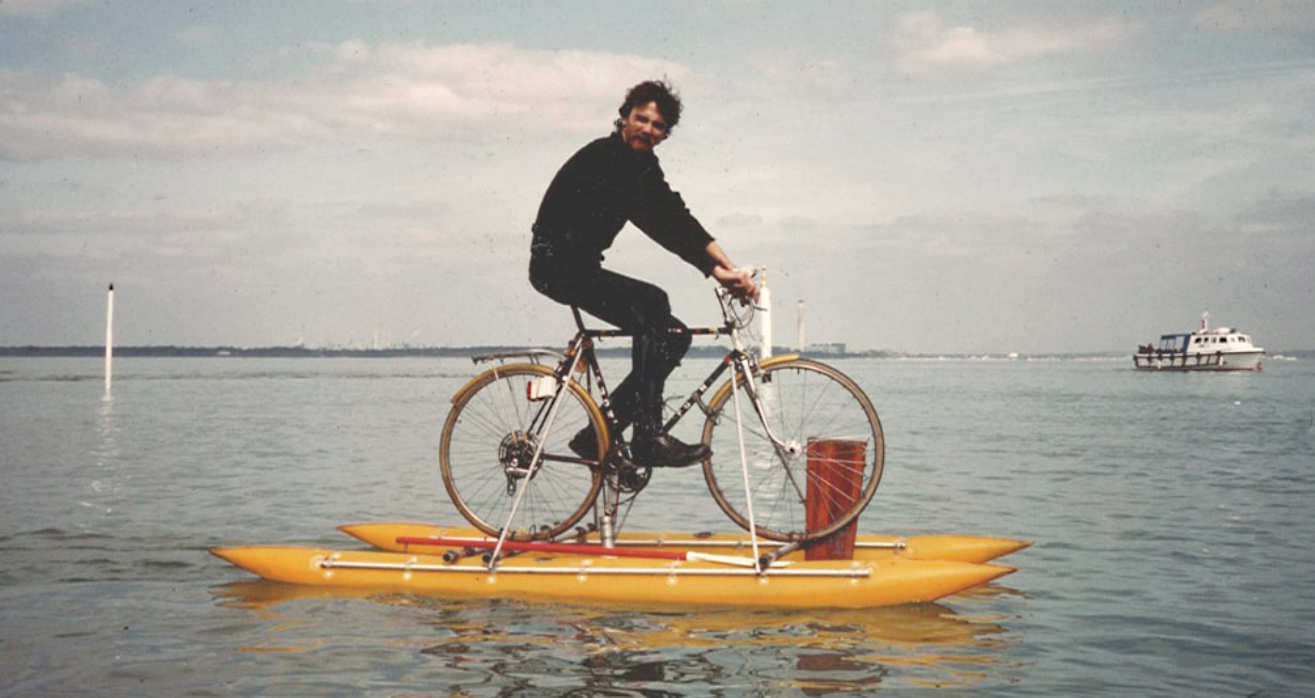
Amphiped on the Solent, 1984

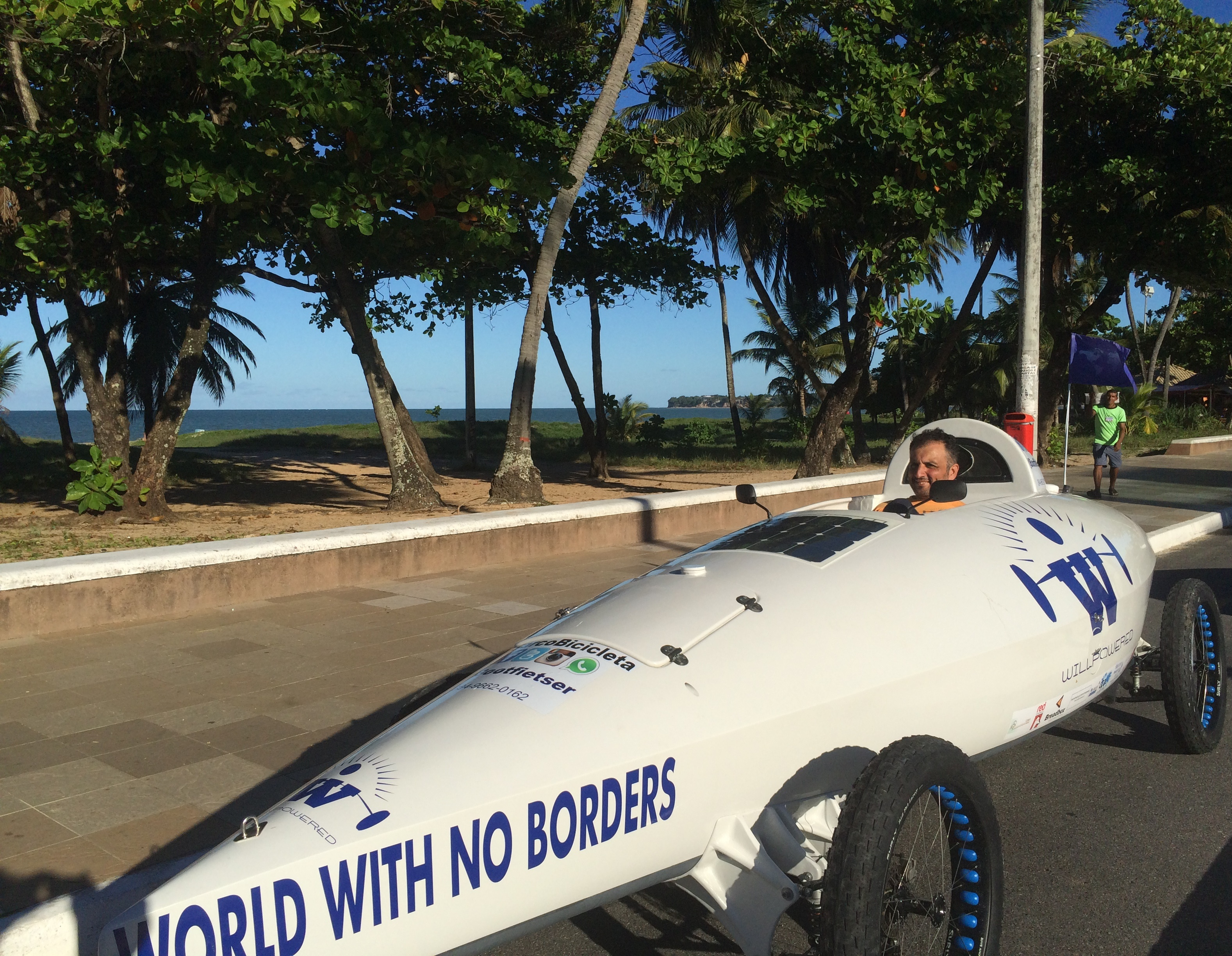
The Ocean Biker, Ebrahim Hemmatnia in his boat bike, March 2015, João Pessoa, Brazil.

Today's designs mostly follow the historic ones. Manufacturers produce models very similar to Morago's "Ciclo Amphibious" of 1971 and earlier designs in large numbers for the waterside rental market, however enlarged to carry two people.

In 1984 Theo Schmidt made the "Amphiped", an inflatable catamaran onto which any standard bicycle could be placed, with a rudder attached to the front wheel and a propeller to the chainwheel. This was used for extended trips along the southern English coast and in competitions.

Very similar is the commercially available Italian Shuttle-Bike Kit. The ensemble, when deflated, fits in a backpack for carrying by the cyclist.

In 1985 engineer Piliponis from Kaunas designed and used his ambibious cycle using a recumbent bicycle and two inflatable cyclinders, total mass 29 kg. Although the rear wheel with spoke-paddles was half-submerged, the pedals and feet were above the water.

A design apparently from 2005 which has received much coverage is "Saidullah's Bicycle." This has been featured on both the Discovery Channel and BBC News The bike uses four rectangular air filled floats for buoyancy which propelled using two fan blades which were attached to the spokes. It seems truly amphibious with the wheels about half-submerged in the water.

A truly amphibious vehicle is that of seven engineering students at the University of Southampton. The amphibious trike combines a recumbent frame with four separate floats and is propelled using a paddle wheel. A speed test on water achieved an average speed of 1.12 m/s. The cyclist could ride the tricycle in and out of the water without mechanical transition and keep dry even with the bottom third of the wheels submerged.

Another recent design was developed by Ebrahim Hemmatnia for his voyage around the world. This velomobile was called the Melanie.

In 2023 Clemens Winter demonstrated his foldable trailer punt with folding bicycle. On the water it is paddled as was a previous design using a catamaran. In this way any cycle-boat combination with compatible dimensions is possible.

== All terrain ==
Competitions for human-powered all-terrain vehicles as kinetic works of art started 1969 in California as the kinetic sculpture race. These often rather large and outrageously decorated vehicles must travel considerable distances on roads including hills, water, mud and sand.

== Tracked vehicles and hovercraft ==
Vehicles with buoyant tracks can run over land and water or even soft ground or shrubbery. They have been in the minds of inventors in particular because they hoped to eliminate the skin friction drag of normal boat hulls this way. Theoretically high speeds could be reached, but in practise there are the penalties of many rollers and their bearings and of the air resistance of such of necessity especially large craft. In practice at least one such craft has been built, the TUUHsnelda campaigned by students of the Technical University Hamburg-Harburg during competitions in Gdansk 1991 and Flensburg 1992. It sported two tracks with 32 rectangular elements each. The above-water frame with two pedalling persons is supported by two end-wheels and two idlers in each track. The best speed recorded was 2 m/s over a distance of 1500 m. A main source of drag was shown to be the splashing and spray of the tracks' entry and exit in the water.

At least three human-powered Hovercraft have been demonstrated. Steve Ball's Dragonfly III covered 100 m over water at 5-9 m/s in 1988. As a sidewall craft, it would be amphibious only with additional wheels. Bobby Dyer demonstrated his hovercraft indoors on a smooth floor in 1996 at 1.9 m/s. A much more elaborate and truly amphibious project is Steamboat Willy campaigned by Chris Roper and team from 2002 until at least 2016. The craft like the others uses a separate fan for lifting and air propeller for propulsion, is able to start hovering on land (with almost any rider) and on water, travel at running speed, and transfer from land to water down a slip or beach (see videos 2 and 4). The duration of hover is limited because of the relatively high power requirement. Hovering from water to land is only possible on very flat beaches because air propellers become relatively inefficient at slow speeds and strongly loaded as up an incline.
