= Maxfield =

Maxfield may refer to:

- Maxfield (name)
- Maxfield Township, Bremer County, Iowa
- Maxfield, Maine
- Maxfield (horse)
