= Max Urbini =

French footballer, sports journalist, and writer (1924–2004)

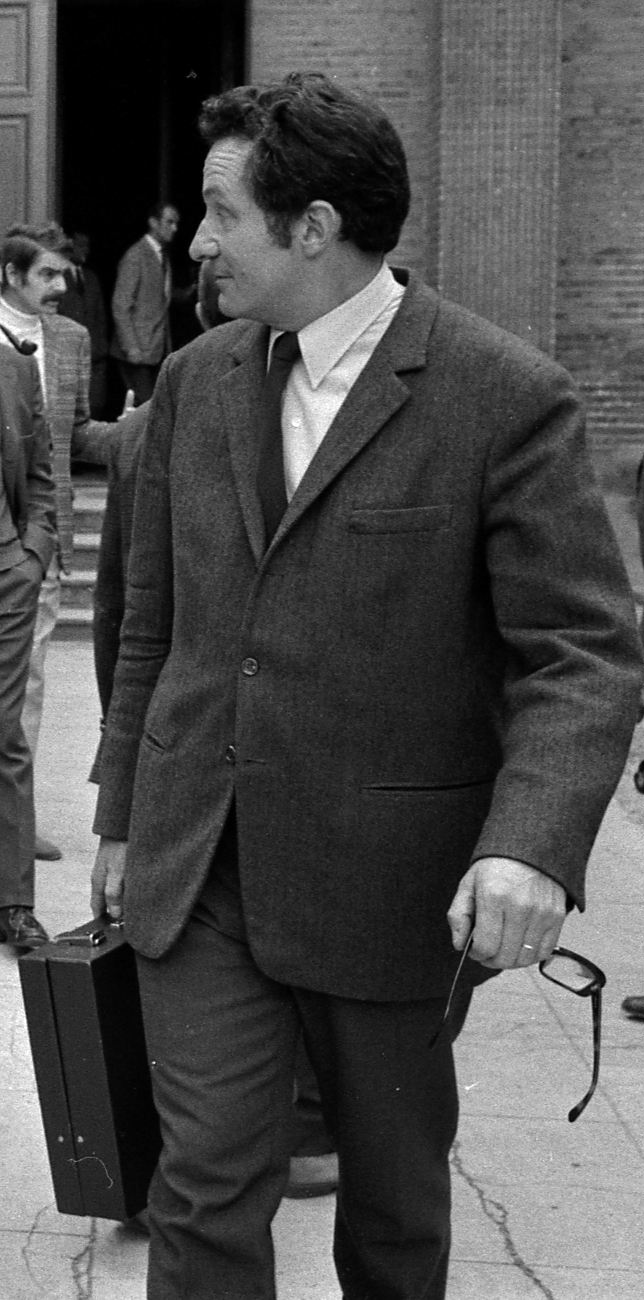
- Born: 17 July 1924 Paris, France
- Died: 13 February 2004 (aged 79) Paris, France
- Genre: sports journalism

Max Urbini (17 July 1924 – 13 February 2004) was a French football player, sports journalist and writer.

In the middle of the 20th century he was one of the leading sports journalists of France, he worked in the newspaper L'Equipe, was a staff member and editor of the magazine France Football, as well as deputy chairman of the union of sports journalists of France. Author of several books about football and football players, including the collection of short stories Football history (in France was published in 1964 with a foreword by Just Fontaine).
