= Max Cole (filmmaker) =

American filmmaker

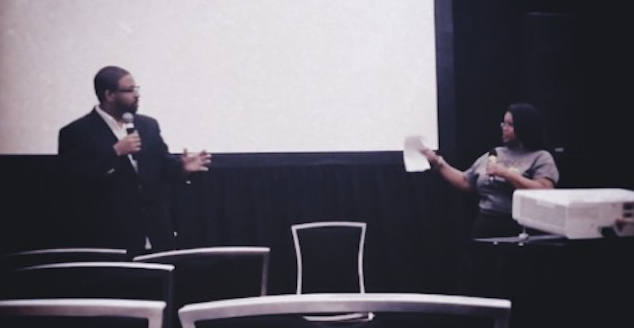
- Max Cole discusses Alone at Midnight during a Q&A.
- Born: Pittsburgh, Pennsylvania
- Occupation(s): Director, film director, filmmaker, screenwriter
- Website: http://maxcolefilms.com

Max Cole is an American filmmaker.

== Early life and career ==
Max Cole is a writer and director located in Los Angeles, California. He was born and raised in Pittsburgh, Pennsylvania. His latest short films have screened in 40+ film festivals across the country.

Cole is also the creator, host, and producer of The Cinema After Dark Podcast — a weekly independent film, television, and entertainment podcast.

=== Short films ===
Year	Film	Credited as		
Year	Film	Director	Producer	Writer
2016	Behind Closed Doors	Yes	Yes	Yes
2016	Last Flight to Los Angeles	Yes	Yes	Yes
2014	The Decision	Yes	Yes	Yes
2014	Alone at Midnight	Yes	Yes	Yes
