= Max Bromme =

German architect (1878–1974)

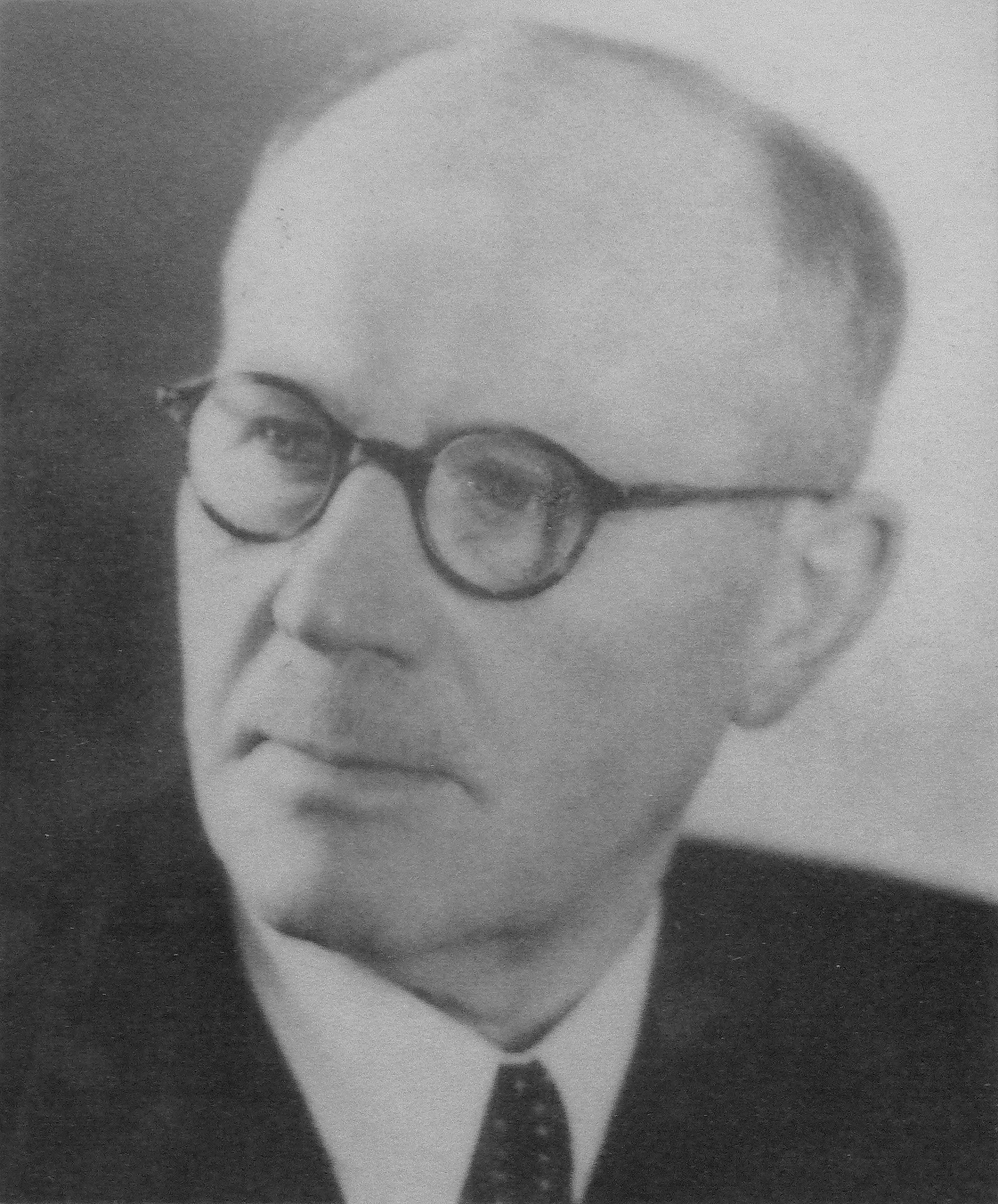

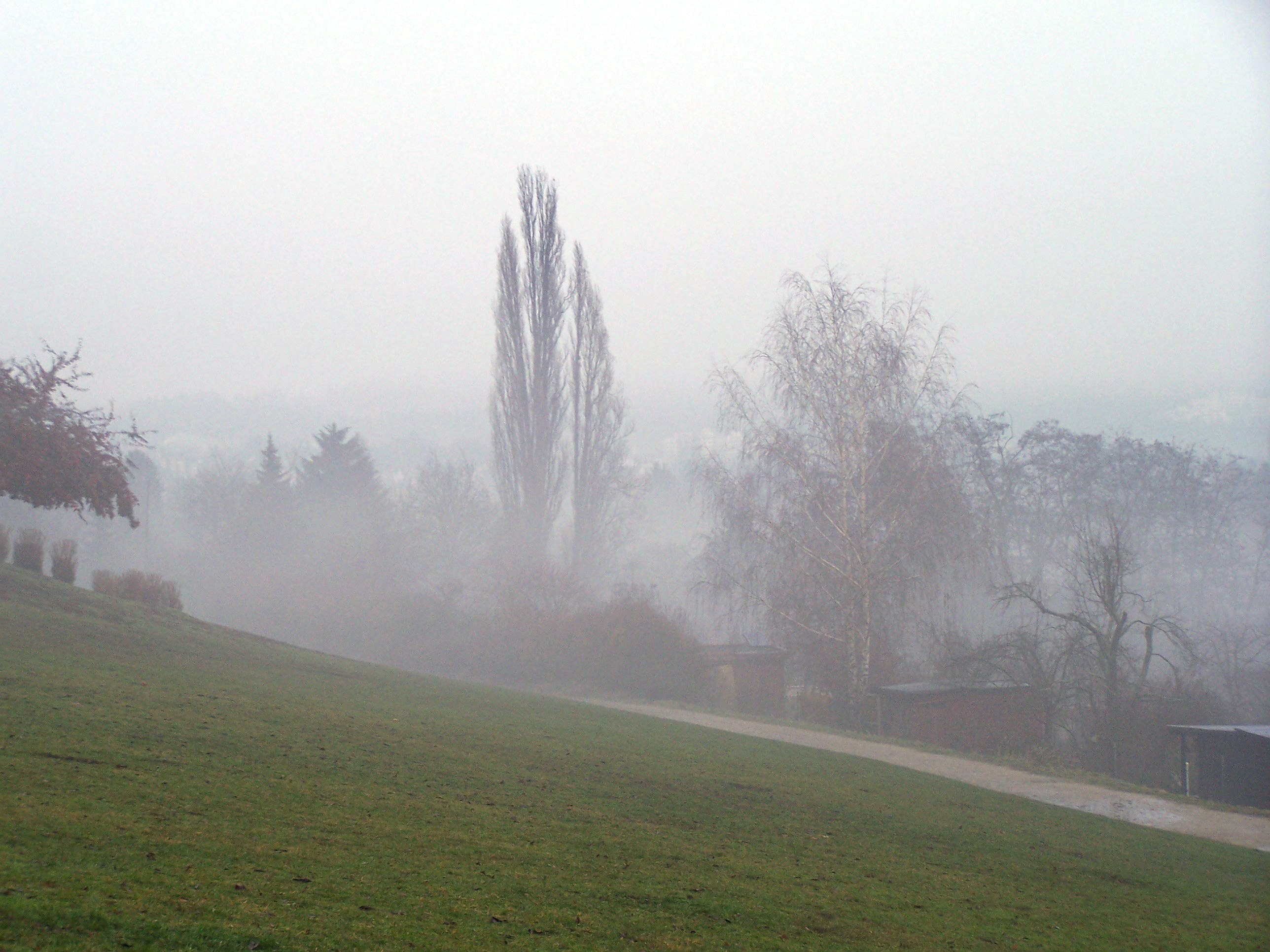
Bornheimer Hang with fog in winter

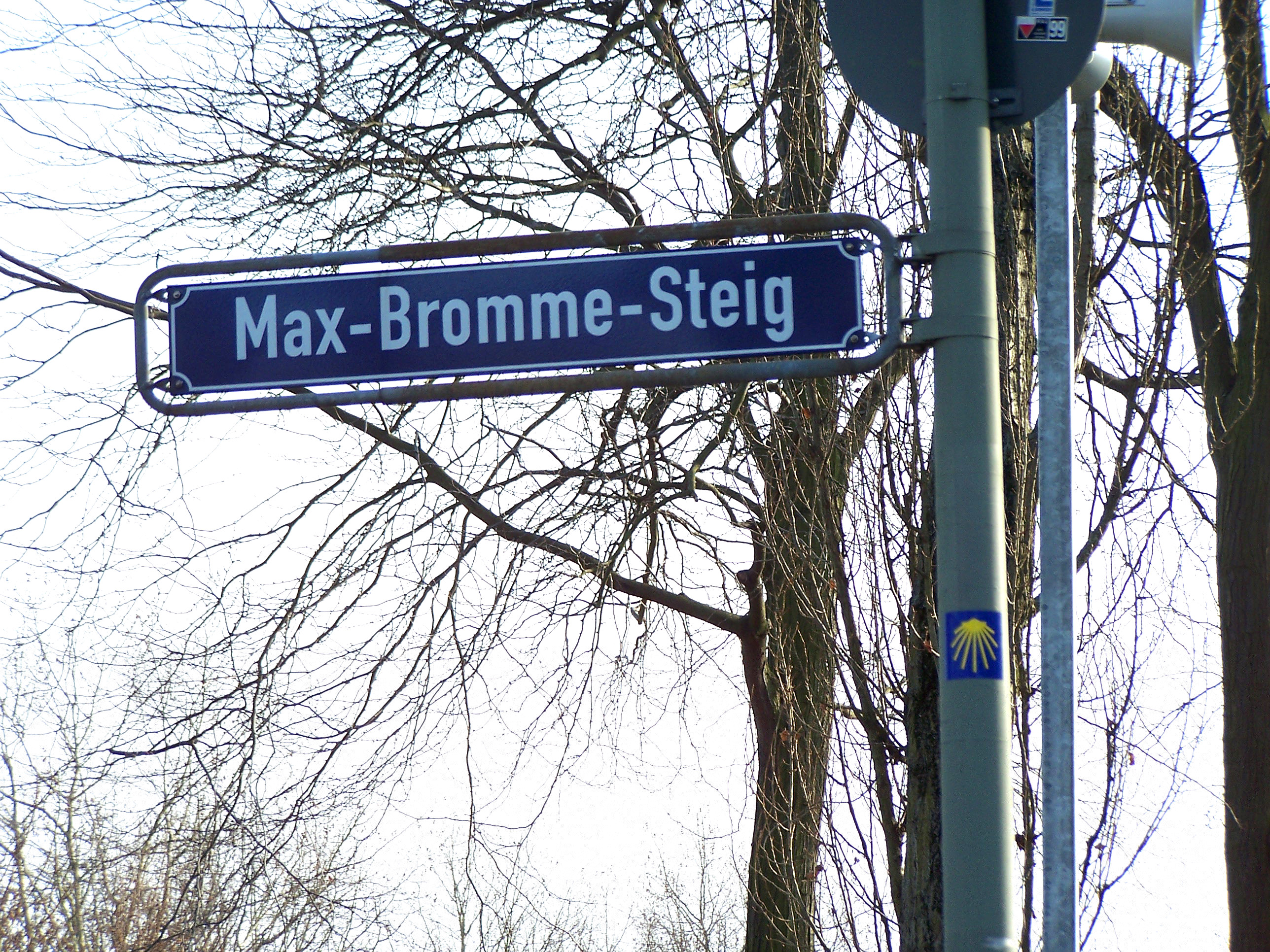
Street sign at the Max-Bromme-Steig beneath the Bornheimer Hang in Frankfurt am Main-Bornheim

Max Bromme (18 August 1878, Grünberg, Silesia – 9 September 1974 in Frankfurt) was a German architect and horticulturist. He was the director of horticulture (from 1912 to 1945), and also director of the Palm House from 1932 to 1945 in Frankfurt. He envisioned first concepts to preserve the Nidda in 1925, by creating a surrounding area as a green free space between town center and the new settlements of the New Frankfurt-project, together with Ernst May. A well-known example of his work is the successful transition between city and landscape known as the Römerstadt. His work was also part of the art competitions at the 1928 Summer Olympics and the 1932 Summer Olympics.

== Completed projects ==
- Park at the Bornheimer Hang, a hillside in Frankfurt-Bornheim
- IG Farben Building-parks
- Extension of the Hauptfriedhof Frankfurt (Main cemetery)
- Brentanopark
- Holzhausenpark
- Solmspark
- Rothschild- and Goldschmidtpark
- Waldstadion Frankfurt
- Westhausen Estate
- Römerstadt Estate
- Huthpark
- Lohrpark
