= Max Wirestone =

American author and librarian

- Education: Washington University
- Occupations: Writer, librarian
- Spouse: Clay Wirestone
- Writing career
- Language: English
- Notable work: Dahlia Moss Mysteries
- Website: www.maxwirestone.com

Max Wirestone is an American author and librarian. He is known for his "Dahlia Moss Mysteries," a series of books about a female millennial gamer who solves mysteries.

== Life ==
Wirestone is a graduate of the Alabama School of Mathematics and Science, and received college degrees in English and German from Washington University in St. Louis. Before becoming a novelist he worked as a librarian. His last name, Wirestone, is a name that he and his husband came up with when they got married. He currently resides in Lawrence, Kansas with his husband and son.

== Books ==
- The Unfortunate Decisions of Dahlia Moss. Redhook. 2015. ISBN 978-0316385978.
- The Astonishing Mistakes of Dahlia Moss. Redhook. 2017. ISBN 978-0316386012.
- The Questionable Behavior of Dahlia Moss. Redhook. 2018. ISBN 978-0316386050.
