= Maxfield (name) =

Maxfield is both a surname and a given name. Notable people with the name include:

Surname:

- Frederick R. Maxfield, American biochemist
- Ian Maxfield (born 1959), Australian politician
- Jim Maxfield (1893–1953), Australian rules footballer
- Margaret Maxfield (1926–2016), American mathematician
- Max Maxfield (born 1945), American politician
- Michael Maxfield (born 1961), American local celebrity
- Mike Maxfield (born 1944), English songwriter and guitarist
- Richard Maxfield (1927–1969), American composer
- Robert "Bob" Maxfield (1941-2024), American businessman and engineer
- Stuart Maxfield (born 1972), Australian rules footballer
- Thomas Maxfield (c. 1590–1616), English Roman Catholic priest and martyr
- Thomas Maxfield (Methodist) (died 1784), English Wesleyan Methodist preacher
- Valerie Maxfield, British archaeologist
- William Maxfield, British Whig politician
- William Maxfield (cyclist) (1916–1943), English cyclist

Given name:

- Maxfield Parrish, American painter and illustrator
