= Max Treitel =

German painter

Max Treitel (December 17, 1890, in Posen – after December 14, 1942, in Auschwitz) was a German painter.

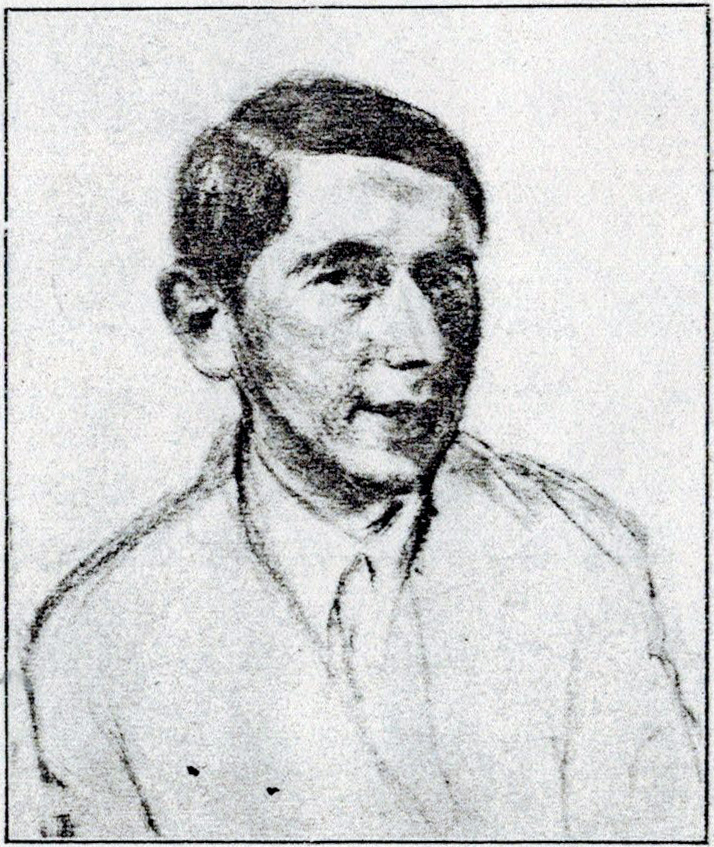
Max Treitel, Youth Portrait. Self-portrait (charcoal drawing).

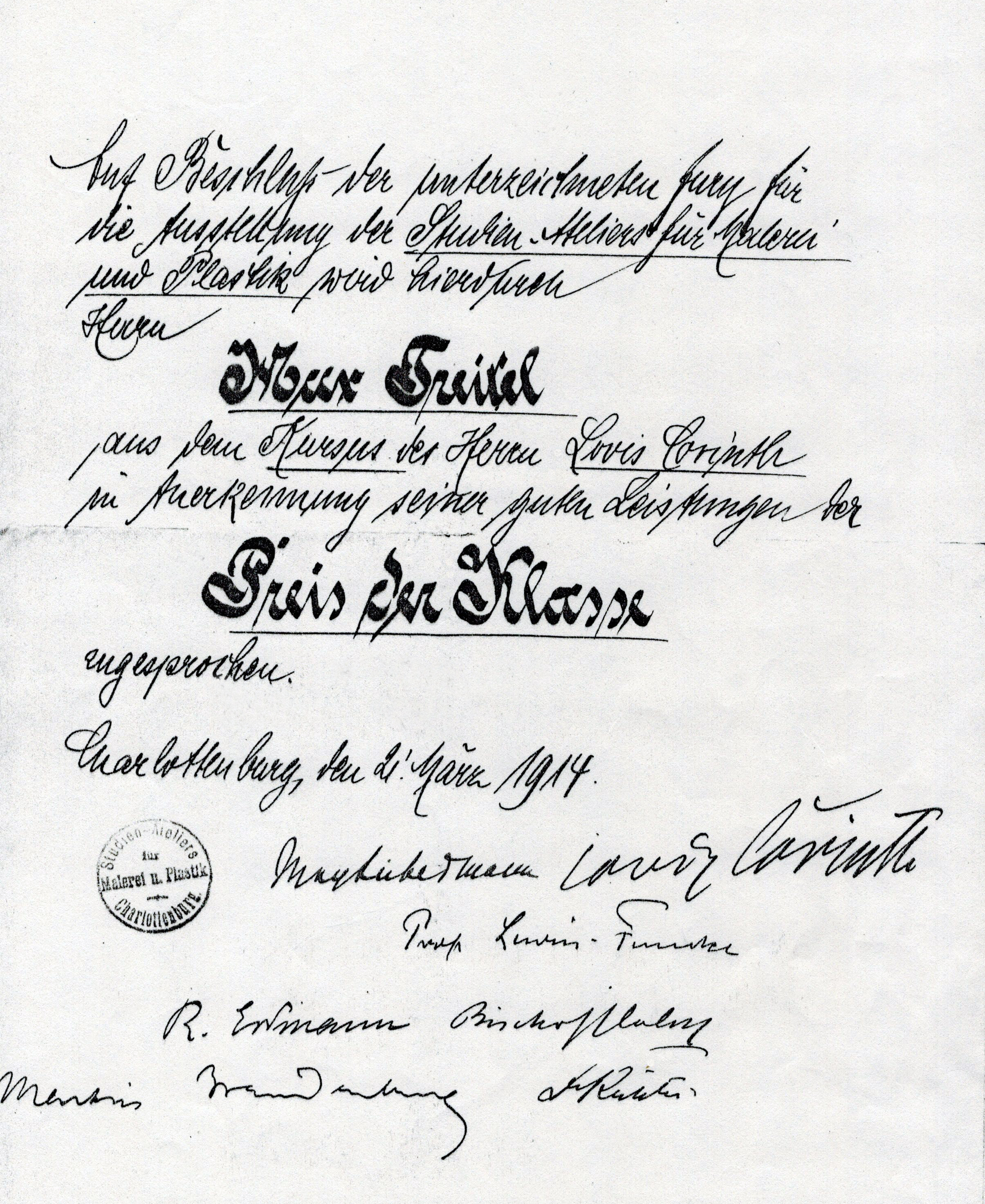
Prize awarded to Max Treitel from the class of Lovis Corinth in recognition of his good achievements, March 21, 1914. Signed by Max Liebermann, Lovis Corinth, Arthur Lewin-Funcke, and Martin Brandenburg (Studio for Painting and Sculpture, Berlin-Charlottenburg)

== Life ==
Treitel came from a very poor Jewish family. Losing his father at an early age, he grew up with his two sisters, Paula and Johanna, raised by their mother. Thanks to his talent, he received strong support from Gustav and Rosalie Goldschmidt, a couple from Posen.

In Berlin-Charlottenburg, he attended the Studio for Painting and Sculpture for several years. As a student in Lovis Corinth's class, he was awarded the "class prize in recognition of his good achievements" on March 21, 1914. The jury for this prize included notable figures like Corinth, Max Liebermann, Professor Arthur Lewin-Funcke, and Martin Brandenburg. Treitel also worked as an illustrator, and was likely a member of the Berlin Secession.

In the early 1920s, Max Treitel painted portraits of several Finnish people residing in Germany. In 1924, Treitel painted a portrait of Johannes Michael Buckx (1881–1946), the first post-Reformation Catholic bishop in Finland, a Dutch priest.

On December 14, 1942, Treitel was deported to Auschwitz with his older, blind, and partially paralyzed sister, Johanna Treitel, with whom he had lived since 1925 at Karlsruher Straße 23 in Berlin. Both were subsequently murdered at Auschwitz. Each sibling is commemorated with a Stolperstein (stumbling stone) outside their residence.

== Works ==
Some of Treitel's works are preserved in the Jewish Museum Frankfurt and in the private collections of his patrons and clients.
