= Max Nicolson =

Australian rules footballer (1917–1997)

Personal information
- Full name: Hector McDonald Nicolson
- Born: 12 October 1917; Kerang, Victoria
- Died: 31 May 1997 (aged 79); Hamilton, Victoria
- Original team: Penshurst
- Height: 180 cm (5 ft 11 in)
- Weight: 85 kg (187 lb)

Playing career^{1}
Years	Club	Games (Goals)
1941	Geelong	8 (0)
- ^{1} Playing statistics correct to the end of 1941.

Hector McDonald "Max" Nicolson (12 October 1917 – 31 May 1997) was an Australian rules footballer who played with Geelong in the Victorian Football League (VFL).

Nicolson served in the Australian Army during World War II.
