= Max Lutje Wooldrik =

Dutch businessman

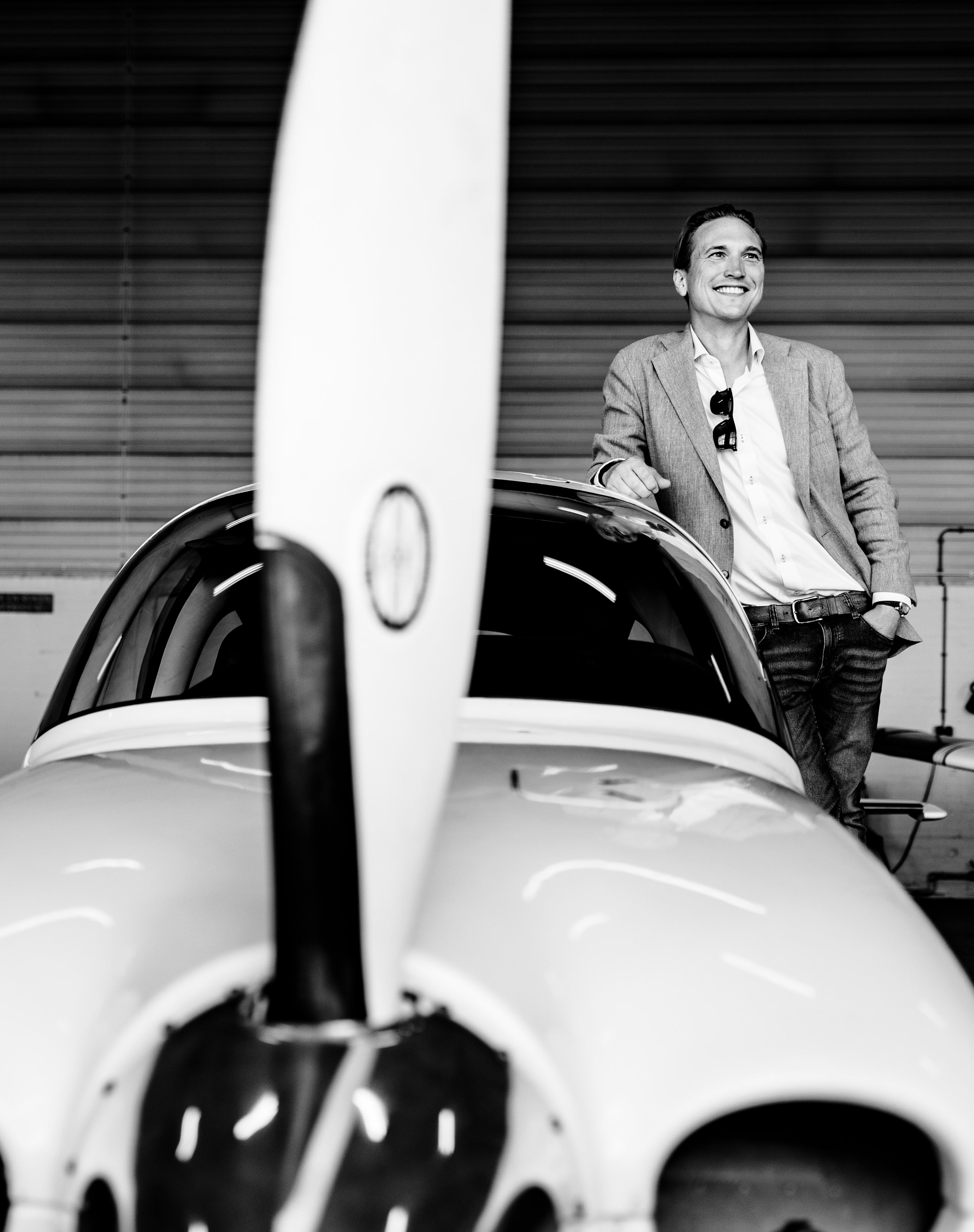
- Max Lutje Wooldrik
- Born: The Hague, Netherlands
- Occupation: Businessman
- Years active: 2001–present
- Employer: APOC Aviation
- Organization: APOC Aviation
- Known for: Founder and CEO of APOC Aviation
- Title: Chief Executive Officer

Max Lutje Wooldrik is a Dutch founder known for his contributions in the aviation industry as the founder and CEO of APOC Aviation.

== Early life and career ==
Max began his career in 2001. Early in his career he co-founded companies, like Lenix Telecom, DLD Software BV, SelectTheDate.com and WilJeBellen.nl. Max has held positions in different organizations, including AELS - Aircraft End-of-Life Solutions, where he served as Manager of Business Development. In 2014 he founded APOC Aviation, a company specializing in aircraft engine, landing gear trading & leasing, component sales, part-out and tear downs.

== APOC Aviation ==
Under Max's leadership, APOC Aviation has achieved notable milestones, such as welcoming Mark Rutte, Prime Minister of the Netherlands, on a fact-finding visit in 2017. A year later, APOC Aviation was nominated for two Rising Star awards by Deloitte. The company was also placed in the 2019 Deloitte Technology Fast 50 ranking. Max Lutje Wooldrik has been actively involved in exploring the potential of emerging technologies, such as blockchain. In 2021, APOC Aviation participated in a pilot program with ABN AMRO that registered the first digital bond on a public blockchain.
