= Max Watman =

American author (born 1971)

- Born: March 29, 1971 (age 54)
- Occupation: Writer
- Website: maxwatman.com

Max Watman (born 1971) is an American author. Born in Shenandoah Valley, Virginia, he holds degrees from Virginia Commonwealth University and Columbia University, and currently lives in Powhatan, Virginia with his wife and son.

He has published three books of nonfiction, including two narrative American histories (of horse racing and moonshine, respectively) and a memoir of his own attempts to engage with the modern realities of food production.

- Race Day: A Spot on the Rail with Max Watman (2005, Ivan R. Dee)
- Chasing the White Dog: An Amateur Outlaw's Adventures in Moonshine (2010, Simon & Schuster)
- Harvest: Field Notes From a Far-Flung Pursuit of Real Food (2014, Norton)

== Work available online ==
- As a book reviewer for The New Criterion, (2000–07)
- As racing correspondent for the New York Sun (2006–2008)
- As a contributor to the Huffington Post (2010-)
