= Max Schutler =

Argentine actor and model (1981–2017)

- Born: Jorge Schmeda; December 10, 1981; Clorinda, Formosa, Argentina
- Died: February 6, 2017 (aged 35); Clorinda, Formosa, Argentina
- Other names: Gustavo Nuñez; Max Schulter; Jorge Schmeder
- Occupations: Actor; model
- Years active: 2005–2015
- Agent: Lucas Entertainment

Max Schutler (December 10, 1981 – February 6, 2017), born Jorge Schmeda (also credited as Jorge Schmeder), was a Argentine adult film actor and model. Throughout his career, which spanned from 2005 to 2015, he performed for many of the industry's studios such as Raging Stallion, TitanMen and Hot House Entertainment. He was frequently selected as a cover model.

== Early Life ==
Schutler was born in Clorinda, Formosa, Argentina. He was a sought-after model for gay and adult magazines.

== Career ==
Schutler debuted in the adult industry in 2005 with the film Tango City for Video 10. Over the next decade, he was credited with approximately forty-five films, working for major studios such as Falcon Studios, Raging Stallion, TitanMen, Hot House Entertainment, and Jet Set Men.

He worked for Lucas Entertainment. He was a featured performer in productions such as Inside Israel and Rocco's Breeding Party. Max's other work includes appearances in various films such as Tim Kruger's TimTales (2009), Stag Homme (2010) and Hard Brit Lads (2010).

Max Schutler received several nominations for his performances in the adult industry. Schutler announced his retirement from the industry in 2011 but made a brief return in 2015 to film for Lucas Entertainment before permanently leaving the screen.

=== Mr. Gay International ===
In 2008, Schutler became the center of a mainstream media controversy after winning the Mr. Gay Argentina title. He was scheduled to represent his country at the Mr. Gay International competition in Los Angeles. However, upon discovering his professional background in the adult film industry, competition organizers disqualified him and asked him to withdraw. He was subsequently replaced by another contestant.

== Death ==
Schutler died on February 6, 2017, in Argentina at the age of 35. His death was confirmed by Str8UpGayPorn. Fellow industry performer Jamie Fox paid tribute to him, remarking on his youth and the lasting memory he would leave with his fans.

== Filmography ==
=== Film ===
Year	Title	Role	Notes
2005	Tango City	Max	Debut
2006	Monster Bang 11: Bang That Ass	Max	
2007	Argentinean Auditions 2	Max	
2007	Backroom Exclusives 3	Max	
2007	Bang That Ass	Max	
2007	Communion	Max	
2007	Grunts: Misconduct	New Recurit	
2007	Grunts: The New Recruits	Recruit	
2007	Jockstrap	Jock	
2007	Mirage	Slave	
2007	On Fire!	Max	
2007	Rush And Release	Max	
2008	Backroom Exclusives 6	Max	
2008	Bailando	Max	
2008	Bailando Tango	Max	
2008	Bar Back	Max	
2008	Boys of Buenos Aires	Max Schutler	
2008	Double Standard	Max	
2008	Folsom Undercover	Max	
2008	Missionary in Argentina	Handsome Boy	
2008	Overdrive	Beach Boy	
2008	Roman's Holiday	Max	
2008	Splish Splash	Max	
2009	Backroom Exclusives 12	Max	
2009	Dickin Around	Max	
2009	Double Barrel	Max	
2009	Ereccion	Max	
2009	Inside Israel	Tourist	
2009	International Auditions	Max	
2009	Straight Edge 1	Max	
2009	Taxed	Max	
2009	Uncut Hombres	Max	
2010	Aaron James Collector's Edition	Max Schutler	
2010	Casting Couch 1	Max	
2010	Honey I'm Home	Max	
2010	Piss Gods	Max	
2010	Roboter	Max	
2010	Stag Reel: Stag Homme 2	Max	
2011	Bunker	Max	
2011	Das Special 7	Max	
2011	Cole Portman: Diamond Pictures Stars	Max	
2011	Rod Daily Loves Dick	Max	
2011	Toy: Stag Homme 6	Max	
2011	Versaut 2	Max	
2014	Tool Belt	Max	
2015	Bareback Cum Swappers	Max	
2015	Joey Pele Slams Max Schutler's Ass	Max Schutler	
2015	Rocco Steele's Breeding Party	Max	
2019	Worshipping A Pissing Cock	Max	Posthumous release

== Awards and nominations ==
Name of the award ceremony, year presented, category, nominee of the award, and the result of the nomination
Year	Award Ceremony	Category	Nominee	Result	Ref.
2008	GayVN Awards	Best Group Scene	Communion	Nominated	
2008	GayVN Awards	Best Newcomer	—N/a	Nominated	
2008	Grabby Awards	Best Group Sex Scene	Mirage	Nominated	
2008	Grabby Awards	Best Versatile Performer	—N/a	Nominated	
2009	XBIZ Awards	GLBT Performer of the Year	—N/a	Nominated	
