= Max Wenkel =

German automobile pioneer (1864–1944)

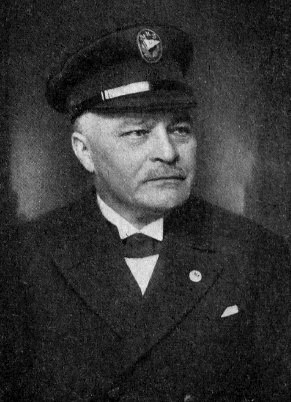
Max Wenkel

Max Wenkel (2 February 1864 – 17 March 1940) was a German automobile pioneer and inventor.

== Life ==
Like other automobile pioneers Max Wenkel began his career as an engineer and inventor with the construction of bicycles. He built his first pennyfarthing bicycle while still an apprentice engineer, and was soon taking part in races with well-known cyclists such as Willy Tischbein, who later became Director General of the Continental-Caoutchouc and Guttapercha Company. He accompanied the future founder of the Adler Bicycle and Automobile Company, Dr. Heinrich Kleyer, on a trip to study the manufacture of bicycles in England at the beginning of the 1880s. Later he was employed at the Duplex bicycle factory in Berlin.

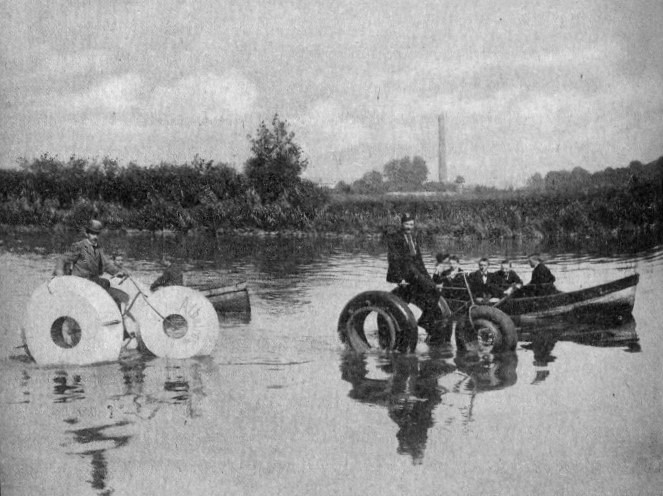
Wenkel's water tricycle 1895

In 1895 he successfully experimented with a water velocipede on the rivers Leine and Ihme near Hanover. As early as 1899 he exhibited a small car at the First International Exhibition in Berlin. Between 1901 and 1903 Wenkel travelled through East India, Java, Sumatra and Borneo, where he built the first Wenkelmobils in rather primitive conditions. When back in Germany, the Berlin factory of Schneider & Co started the production of his Wenkelmobil. Wenkel won numerous prizes with it in races in its small-car class. In 1906 and 1907 he travelled the length of South America down to Patagonia in a Wenkelmobil. He was officially commissioned to open up the Cordillera region for motor traffic, and also built flat-bottomed speed boats suitable for Argentine rivers. Wenkel acquired several patents, e.g. for the Wenkelmobil’s friction drive and a high-speed compression and vacuum pump. The Berlin Directory lists him as engineer and owner of a technical bureau and export firm during World War I. When well over sixty he won the prestigious Garbaty Trophy with his speedboat "Java II", in 1929. Three years later he was still making his mark with the invention of a "motor in a trunk car", a newfangled though unsuccessful miniature automobile.

== Wenkelmobil ==
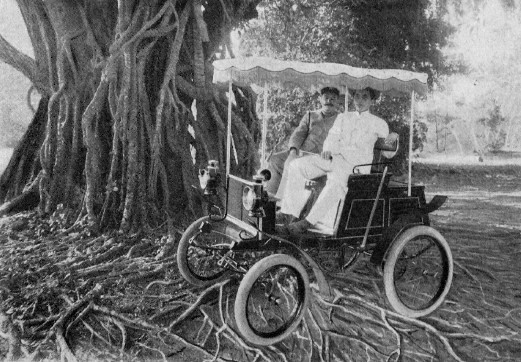
Early Wenkelmobil built in Java

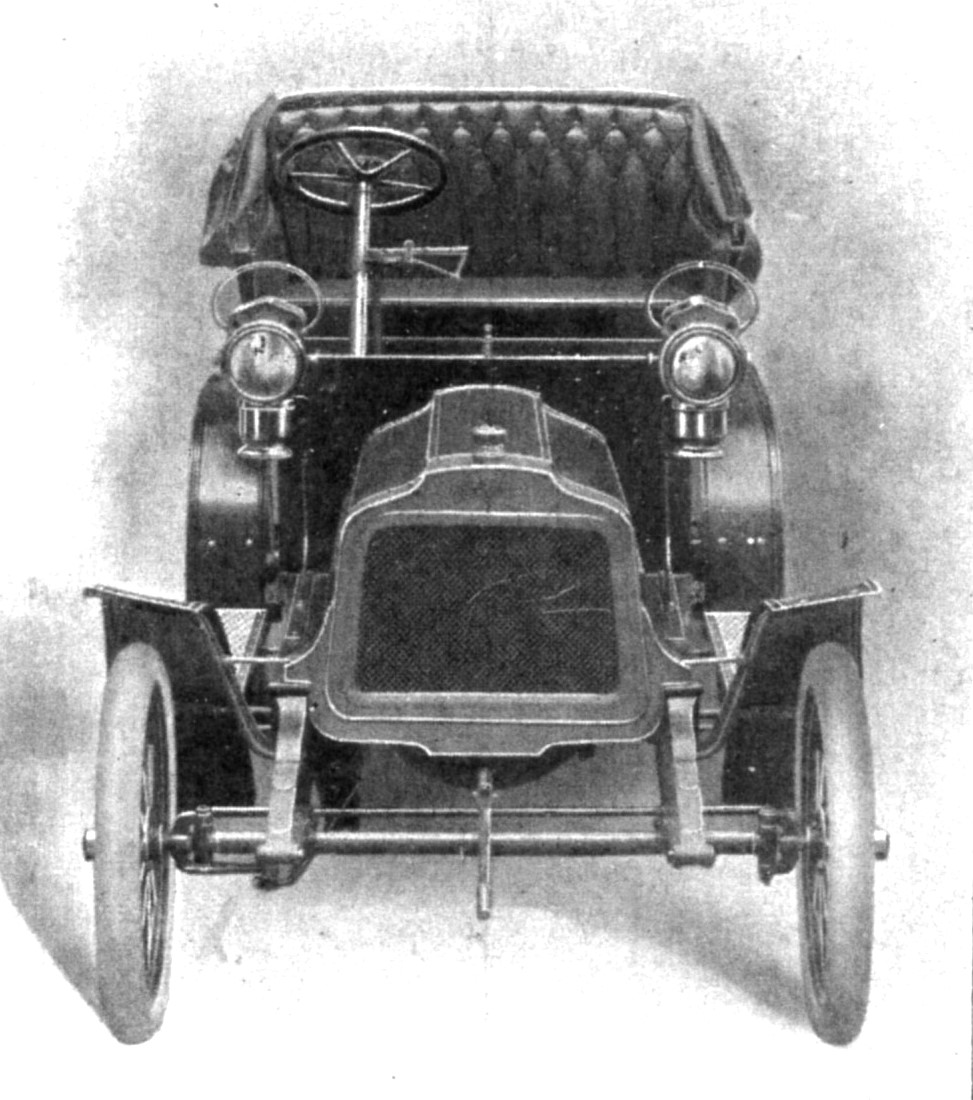
Wenkelmobil front view

Wenkel's first car, built around 1899, was based on a light tubular steel frame for an air-cooled De-Dion-Bouton engine, originally developed for tricycles. The rear axle was chain-driven. The next model, a four-seater with a break chassis and a stronger water-cooled Aster motor with battery ignition, he was already calling a "Wenkelmobil". With an improved 4-hp version with a Belgian Vivinus engine he travelled through the Far East from 1901 to 1903 and built Wenkelmobils adapted to the tropical climate in Java, where petrol was very cheap. The construction followed that of light American steam cars, with a standing engine in the rear and friction drive. After his return to Berlin Schneider & Co produced several models of the Wenkelmobil, which was at first a reasonably successful small car. The construction of the car was described in a contemporary automobile magazine with reference to the picture alongside:

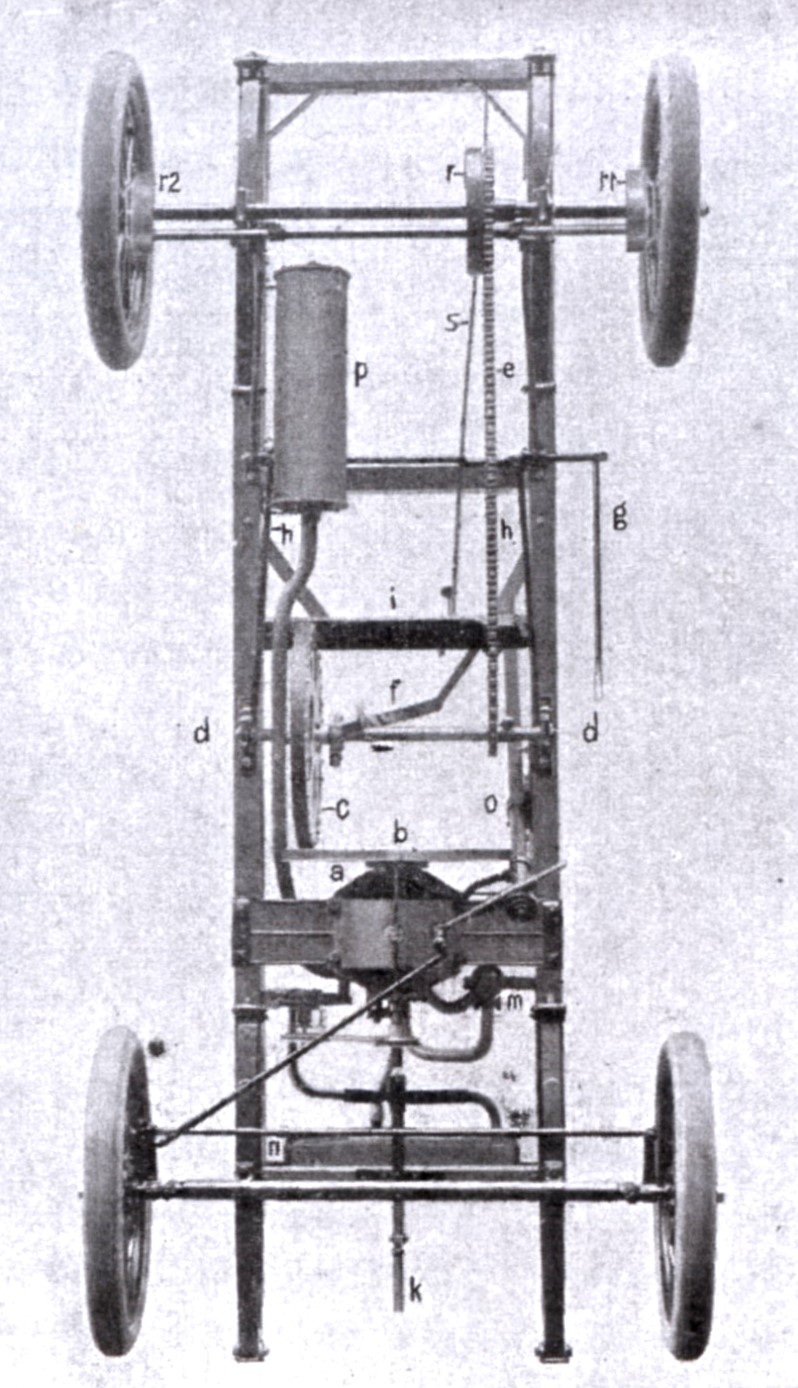
Chassis of a Wenkelmobil

"The engine a sets the face plate b, which serves as the flywheel, into motion and the rotation is transferred to the discus wheel c. Through this the shaft dd with the sprocket turns. Thus the chain e drives the rear axle. The speed is adjusted by shifting the discus wheel c on the shaft dd by means of the hand lever fastened to the left of the upper end of the steering column and the articulated lever f. The bearings of the shaft dd with the discus wheel c can be shifted forwards and backwards carriage-like by the hand lever g to the right of the driver's seat. By means of this hand lever the discus wheel c is engaged with the face plate b and the engine, or idling, pressed backwards against the brake arm f to brake the car. So this lever serves both to brake and to engage the clutch. Independently of the aforementioned brake there are two band brakes r_{1} and r_{2} on both rear wheels. The beehive radiator n cools the cylinders by means of the belt-driven pump l. The chassis is made of iron-reinforced wood. The front axle is straight, the rear axle is full-length and has no differential."

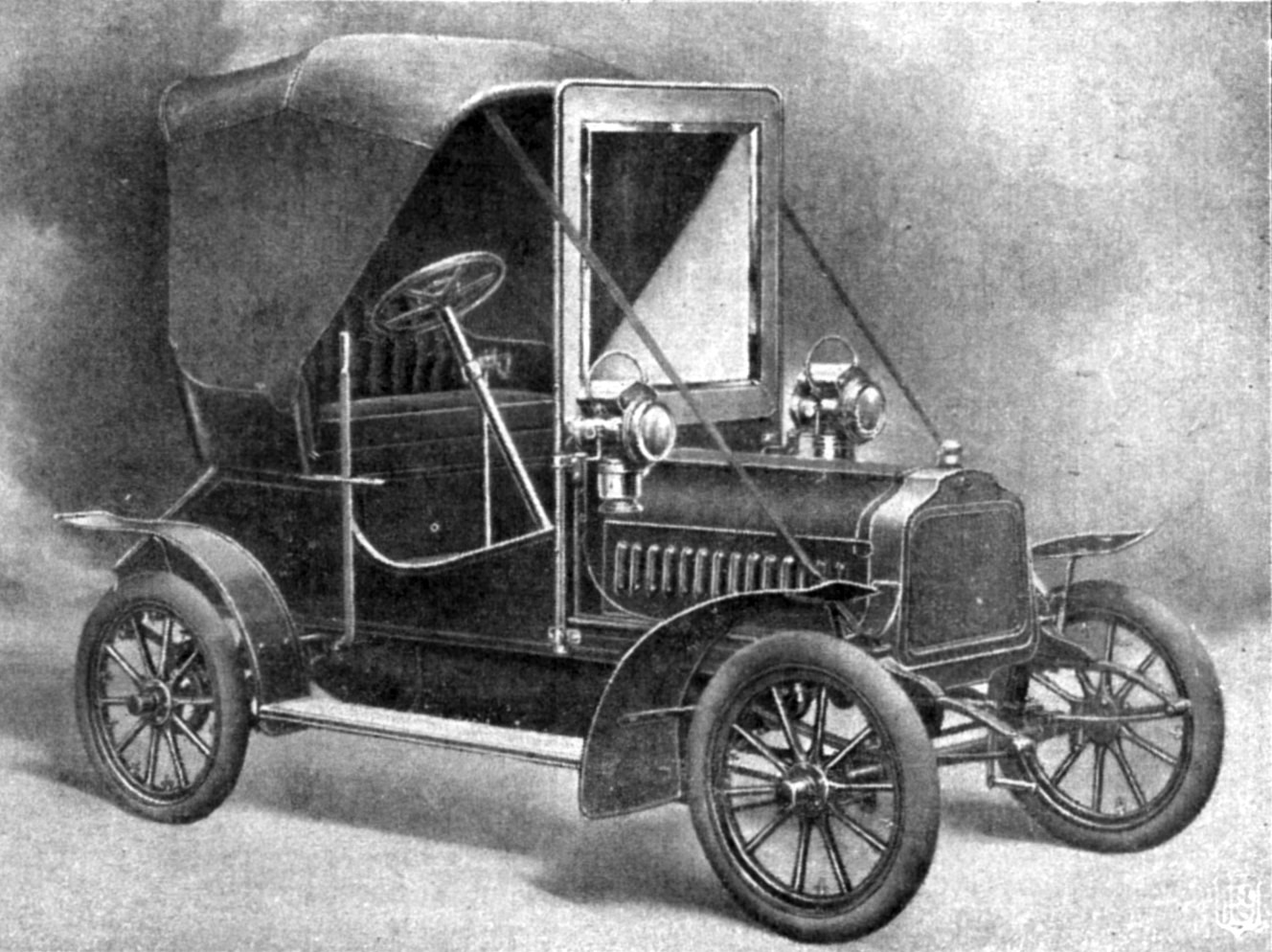
Wenkelmobil with glass screen and folding roof

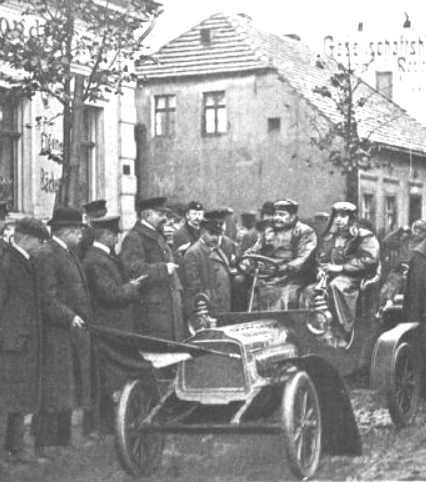
The inventor Wenkel on his Wenkelmobil in 1906

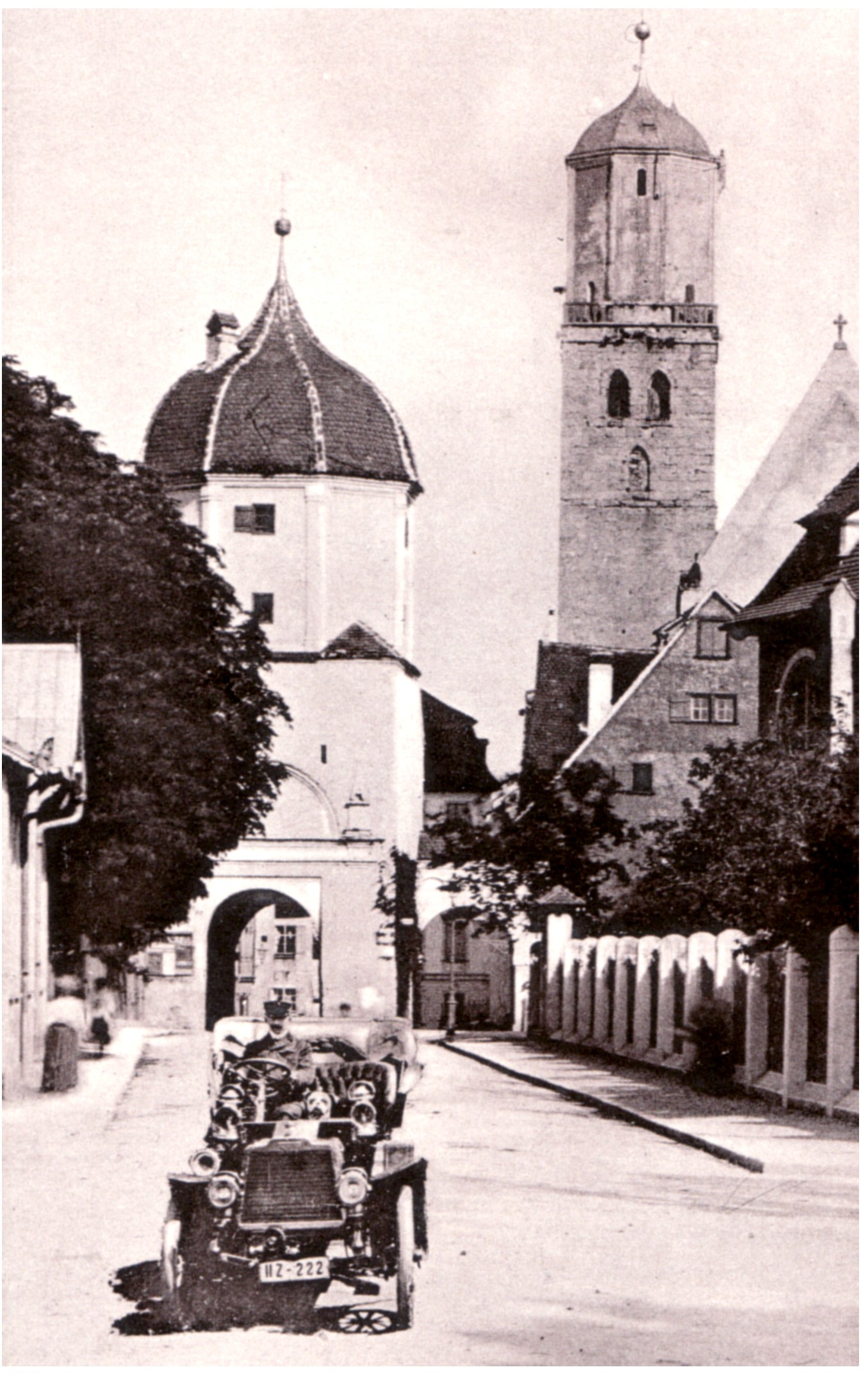
Wenkelmobil at Memmingen Westertor in 1910

In 1906 a model with a 9/10 hp engine was produced, but in the long run the car was not able to compete because of its friction drive and lack of a differential. In 1907, while Wenkel was travelling through South America, production of the Wenkelmobil was stopped because of falling demand.
