= Pink Man =

American unicyclist (born 1961)

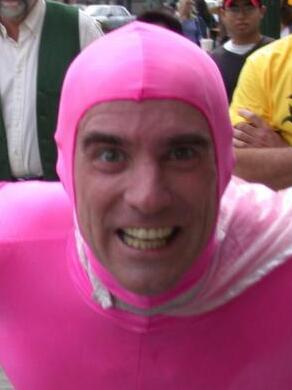
- Pink Man in September 2006
- Born: Michael Maxfield; 1961; Leominster, Massachusetts
- Known for: public unicycling performances

Michael Maxfield (born 1961), also known as Pink Man, is a local celebrity from the San Francisco Bay Area. He can be seen riding his unicycle around the cities of Berkeley, Oakland and San Francisco. He gets his name from the shocking pink unitard and cape he wears while he performs impromptu unicycle tricks in public places—spinning, engaging in sudden stops, riding down the street at high speeds, and carrying people on his back.

Maxfield was born and grew up in Leominster, Massachusetts, where he discovered the unicycle at age 13. He moved to San Francisco at age 19, and then to Oregon. While in Oregon, he started performing on his unicycle under the name Jester Max. When he moved back to Leominster years later, he found himself spending hours dancing on his unicycle, and pedalling around town, garnering a front page story in the Worcester Telegram. He moved back to Oregon, where he sought out a new unicycle persona; on a whim, he purchased a pink Lycra unitard costume from a dancewear catalog. The new outfit proved extremely popular, and an onlooker at the University of Oregon campus dubbed him "pink man".

Pink Man has performed in Oregon, Los Angeles, Houston, the San Francisco Bay Area, New Jersey, New York, the Pacific Northwest, Jacksonville, Vancouver, Paris, Tokyo, and Germany. His Tokyo and Paris trips were sponsored by computer-game designer Will Wright, who calls Pink Man "the only real superhero I know".

== Media ==
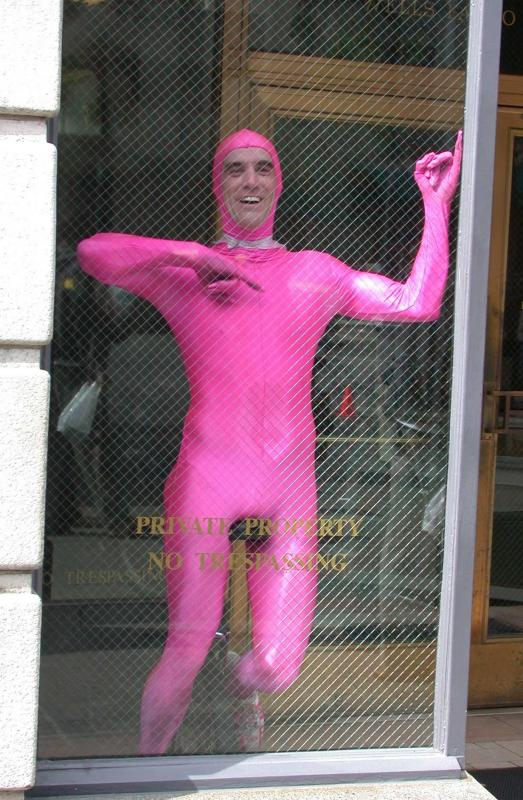
Pink Man brandishes his pinkies through a window.

In 2002, Pink Man performed on his unicycle in a play titled "I Wheel, the Pink Man Show" which ran at the Live Oak Theater in Berkeley, California. In 2005, he appeared in the documentary film Following Sean. In May 2009, he was seen on his unicycle amusing passers-by on the streets of central London.

In 2006, Pink Man was the subject of an article in local alt weekly Folio Weekly titled "Pinky and the Brain". In it, Maxfield discusses events that led him to lead a nomadic lifestyle, including accusations of molestation and the subsequent dissolution of his marriage.

As of January 2008, there is a documentary film about Pink Man in production.
