= Max Waldmeier =

Swiss astronomer

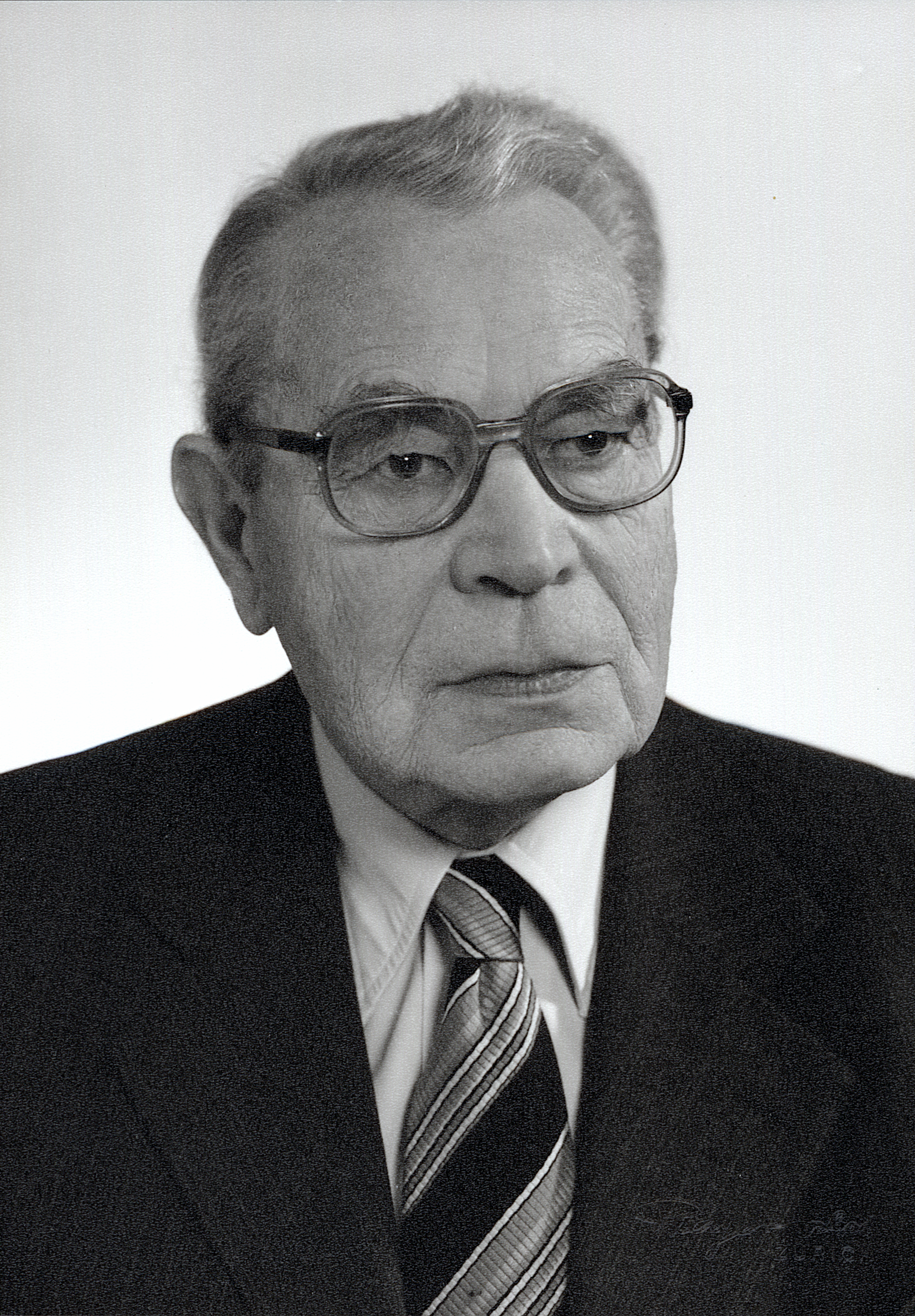
- Born: 18 April 1912
- Died: 26 September 2000 (aged 88)
- Occupation: Astronomer

Max Waldmeier (18 April 1912 – 26 September 2000) was a Swiss astronomer, known for his research on sunspots. As director of the Zurich Observatory until 1980, Waldmeier insisted on counting sunspots by eye over automated methods, using a Fraunhofer refracting telescope installed by Zurich Observatory director Rudolf Wolf in 1849.

== Legacy ==
Waldmeier was known for his "stubborn traditionalism" about how sunspots should be studied. He has been variously described as "one of the leading personalities in solar physics of the 20th century" and "the most arrogant astronomer in Switzerland in the mid-20th century."
