= Max Zerwick =

German Jesuit (1901–1975)

- Born: 26 May 1901; Lindau
- Died: 10 October 1975; Munich
- Occupation: Biblical scholar
- Employer: Pontifical Biblical Institute

Fr. Maximilian Zerwick, S.J. (1901 – 1975) was a German Jesuit priest, biblical scholar, exegete and professor at the Pontifical Biblical Institute.

== Life ==
Max Zwerwick was born on May 26, 1901, in Lindau, the son of a private banker. In 1920, he joined the Society of Jesus and completed his novitiate in Tisis (Vorarlberg).

Zerwick studied theology at the University of Innsbruck, he earned a doctorate in theology and was ordained a priest in 1931. From 1932 to 1935, he studied Classical Philology at the University of Vienna, completing his studies with a doctorate before moving to the Pontifical Biblical Institute in 1936, where he taught Biblical Greek until 1973.

In 1937, following Fr. O'Rourke's return to New York, Zerwick succeeded him as professor of Biblical Greek at the Biblicum, a post he occupied until his death; beginning in 1953, he also served as professor of New Testament exegesis. From 1939 onward, he served as editor-in-chief of the journal Verbum Domini, in which he published his University of Vienna dissertation, Untersuchungen zum Markus-Stil.

In 1960, the Department of Dogmatic Theology at the Lateran University criticized Zerwick's use of the historical-critical method in biblical interpretation. On June 20, 1961, the Holy Office endorsed this criticism. It warned against questioning the historicity of the Gospels. At the end of the 1961–1962 academic year, Zerwick, along with Dean Fr. Stanislaus Lyonnet, S.J., was relieved of his teaching duties at the Pontifical Biblical Institute by the Holy Office as a result of this, but was rehabilitated in 1964 at the instigation of Pope Paul VI.

He died on October 10, 1975, in Munich.

== Works ==
Theses

- Zerwick, Max (1937). Untersuchungen zum Markus-Stil: Ein Beitrag sur stilistischen Durcharbeitung des Neuen Testaments. Rome: Pontifical Biblical Institute.

Books

- Zerwick, Maximiliano (1949). Graecitas bíblica. Pontificio Instituto Biblico.
- ————————— (1953). Analysis Philologica Novi Testamenti Graeci. Romae: sumptibus Pontificii Instituti Biblici.
- ————————— (1955). Graecitas Biblica. Exemplis Illustratur a Maximiliano Zerwick S.J. (Editio Tertia Aucta et Emendata ed.). Romae: Pontificio Instituto Biblico.
- ————————— (1957). Exegesis in Lc 9, 51-11, 53. Romae: E Pontificio Instituto Biblico.
- —————————; Zorell, Franz (1961). Lexicon Graecum Novi Testamenti. P. Lethielleux.
- ————————— (1962). Biblical Greek: Illustrated by Examples by Maximilian Zerwick S.J. English Edition adapted from the Fourth Latin Edition by Joseph Smith S.J. Subsidia Biblica. Vol. 41. Translated by Smith, Joseph. Pontificio Istituto Biblico.
- —————————; Grosvenor, Mary B. (1996). A Grammatical Analysis of the Greek New Testament Vol. I: Gospels—Acts. Gregorian Univ Pr. ISBN 9788876535888.
- —————————; Gnilka, Joachim; Mussner, Franz (1978). The Epistles to the Philippians, Colossians, and Ephesians. New Testament for Spiritual Reading. Vol. 8. Sheed and Ward.
- —————————. Epistle to Ephesians. Crossroad Pub Co. ISBN 9780824501259.
