= Mahk =

Mahk may refer to:

- Mahk, a transliteration of the Cantonese surname 麥 using Yale romanization
- Mahk, the native name of the Tanna ground dove, an extinct bird species

== See also ==
- Mac
- Mach
- Mack
- Mak
- Makh
- Makk
- Mark
