= Alpha max =

Alpha max or variation, may refer to:

- Critical angle of attack (α max), the highest nose-up attitude at speed before stalling
- An element in the mathematical algorithm Alpha max plus beta min algorithm
- AlphaMax Academy (founded 1998) a private international school in Suriname

== See also ==
- Street Fighter Alpha 3 Max (videogame)
- Amax (disambiguation)
- alpha (disambiguation)
- max (disambiguation)
