= Max =

Max or MAX may refer to:

== Animals ==
- Max (American dog) (1983–2013), a beagle, dachshund, and terrier mix
- Max (British dog) (2007–2022), the first pet dog to win the PDSA Order of Merit (animal equivalent of the OBE)
- Max (gorilla) (1971–2004), a western lowland gorilla at the Johannesburg Zoo who was shot by a criminal in 1997

== Brands and enterprises ==
- Australian Max Beer
- Max Hamburgers, a fast-food corporation
- MAX Index, a Hungarian domestic government bond index
- Max Fashion, an Indian clothing brand

== Computing ==
- MAX (operating system), a Spanish-language Linux version
- Max (programming language), a music programming language
- MAX Machine, 1982 home computer by Commodore
- Multimedia Acceleration eXtensions, extensions for HP PA-RISC
- Max (app), Russian messenger software

== Films ==
- Max (1994 film), a Canadian film by Charles Wilkinson
- Max (2002 film), a film about Adolf Hitler
- Max (2015 film), an American war drama film
- Max (2024 film), an Indian Kannada language film by Vijay Karthikeyaa

== Games ==
- Dancing Stage Max, a 2005 game in the Dance Dance Revolution series
- DDRMAX Dance Dance Revolution or MAX, a North American music video game
- DDRMAX Dance Dance Revolution 6thMix or MAX, a 2001 Japanese music video game
- M.A.X.: Mechanized Assault & Exploration, a computer game

== Literature ==
- Max (book series), a children's book series by Barbro Lindgren and Eva Eriksson
- Max (children's book), a children's book by Bob Graham
- Max (Fast novel), a 1982 novel by Howard Fast
- MAX: A Maximum Ride Novel, a novel by James Patterson

== Magazines ==
- Max (French magazine)
- Max (German magazine) (1991–2008)
- Max (Italian magazine) (1985–2013)
- Max, a 1990s Australian magazine later retitled Maxim
- Max, a Mexican magazine

== Music ==
- MAX (group), a Japanese vocal group
- Max Schneider, better known by the mononym MAX, American singer
- Max (Max Mutzke album), 2015
- Max (Max Roach album), 1958
- Max, a 1977 album by The Rumour
- The Max, a song by Prince on his 1992 album Love Symbol
- "Max", a song by Paolo Conte

== People and fictional characters ==
- Max (given name), including nicknames and fictional characters
- Max (surname), a list of people and a fictional character
- Max Beerbohm (1872–1956), English essayist, parodist and caricaturist under the signature Max
- Max Bygraves (1922-2012) English entertainer
- Max (Spanish cartoonist), pen name of Francesc Capdevila Gisbert (born 1956)
- Max Schneider (born 1992), American singer known as MAX
- Max (Korean singer), stage name of Korean singer Shim Chang-min (born 1988)
- Maximiano de Sousa (1918–1980), Portuguese Fado singer also known as Max
- Max (footballer, born 1975), Brazilian goalkeeper Maxlei dos Santos Luzia
- Max (footballer, born 1983), Brazilian former footballer Max Brendon Costa Pinheiro
- Max (footballer, born 1987), Brazilian footballer Maximiliano Lélis Rodrigues
- Max (footballer, born 1990), Brazilian footballer Marcil Elias da Silva
- Max (footballer, born 2002), Brazilian footballer Maswel Ananias Silva
- Max Alves (born 2001), Brazilian footballer known simply as Max
- Max (drag queen), Max Malanaphy, a competitor on season 7 of RuPaul's Drag Race

== Places ==
=== United States ===
- Max, Indiana, an unincorporated community
- Max Township, Itasca County, Minnesota
  - Max, Minnesota, an unincorporated community
- Max, Missouri, a ghost town
- Max, Nebraska, an unincorporated community and census-designated place
- Max, North Dakota, a town

=== Elsewhere ===
- El Max, Alexandria, Egypt, a neighborhood

== Television ==
=== Channels and networks ===
- Max (Australian TV channel)
- Max (Canadian TV channel)
- Rex (Norwegian TV channel), a Norwegian TV channel, formerly named Max
- Omroep MAX, a Netherlands TV broadcaster
- Sony Max, an Indian pay television channel
- Cinemax or Max, an American television network
- HBO Max, a video on demand streaming service, formerly named Max

=== Episodes ===
- "Max" (The X-Files)
- "Max", a 1978 episode of The Bionic Woman

== Transportation ==
- MAX (Calgary), a bus system in Calgary, Alberta, Canada
- MAX, a former branding for bus rapid transit used by the Utah Transit Authority in Utah, US
- MAX Bus Rapid Transit (Colorado), a bus system in Fort Collins, Colorado, US
- Macatawa Area Express, a bus system in Holland, Michigan, US
- MAX Light Rail, a rail service in Portland, Oregon, US
- Arriva Max, a UK bus service brand
- Boeing 737 MAX, an airliner made by the American company Boeing
- B-ON Max, a panel van
- Moyes Max, an Australian hang glider design
- Madera Area Express (now Madera Metro), a transit agency in Madera, California, US
- Metro Area Express (Perth), a proposed light rail system in Perth, Western Australia
- Metropolitan Area Express BRT Line or MAX, a bus system in Las Vegas, Nevada, US
- Metro Arlington Xpress, a public transit system in Texas, US
- Modesto Area Express (now Stanislaus Regional Transit Authority), a transit agency in Modesto, California, US
- MAX Transit, a bus system in Birmingham, Alabama, US
- E1 Series Shinkansen or Max, a bullet train in Japan
- E4 Series Shinkansen or Max, a bullet train in Japan

== Other uses ==
- Max (comics), sometimes stylized as MAX Comics, a Marvel Comics imprint aimed at adult-only readers
- MAX (gene), a human gene
- Maxillaria or Max, an orchid genus
- The Max, a fictitious hangout on Saved by the Bell (also featured on The New Class and the 2020 reboot)
- Maximum, abbreviated max.
- max and min, operations to obtain maximal and minimal elements

== See also ==
- Macx (disambiguation)
- Macs (disambiguation)
- Mad Max (disambiguation)
- MAKS (disambiguation)
- Maxie (disambiguation)
- Maximilian (disambiguation)
- Maximus (disambiguation)
- Maxx (disambiguation)
- Mighty Max (disambiguation)
