= Mac (nickname) =

As a nickname, Mac may refer to:

== In arts and media ==
- Mac Brandt (born 1980), American actor
- Mac Curtis (1939–2013), American musician
- Mac DeMarco (born 1990), Canadian singer-songwriter, musician and producer
- Mac Lethal (born 1981), American rapper, songwriter and author
- Mac Martin (1925-2022), American bluegrass musician
- Mac McNeilly (born 1960), American drummer
- Mac Miller (1992–2018), American rapper and record producer
- Malcolm John "Mac" Rebennack (1940–2019), better known by the stage name Dr. John, American singer-songwriter, pianist and guitarist
- Mac Sebree (1932–2010), American journalist, writer and publisher
- McLean Stevenson (1927–1996), American actor
- Mac Wiseman (1925–2019), American bluegrass singer
- Akshay Kumar (born 1967), Indian film actor, known as "Mac" after the character portrayed by him in the 2005 comedy film Garam Masala
- Stanley McMurtry (born 1936), British cartoonist who used the pen name "Mac"

== In sport ==
- Mac Cody (born 1972), American National Football League player
- Mac Colville (1916–2003), Canadian National Hockey League player
- Mac Evans (1884–1977), Australian cricket and soccer player
- Mac Foster (1942–2010), American heavyweight boxer
- Mac Hippenhammer (born 1998), American football player
- Mac Jones (born 1998), American football player
- Mac May (born 1999), American volleyball player
- Mac McCain (born 1998), American football player
- Clark McConachy (1895–1980), New Zealand billiards and snooker player
- Stan McCormick (1923–1999), English rugby league footballer and coach
- Mac McClung, NBA G-League player
- Mac McWilliams (born 2001), American football player
- Macdonald Smith (1892–1949), Scottish golfer
- Mac Suzuki (born 1975), Major League Baseball pitcher from Japan
- Mac Wright (cricketer) (born 1998), Australian cricketer

== In other fields ==
- Malcolm Baldrige Jr. (1922–1987), American businessman and United States Secretary of Commerce
- McGeorge Bundy (1919–1996), United States National Security Advisor to Presidents John F. Kennedy and Lyndon B. Johnson
- Mac Kittredge, American politician
- Charles H. MacDonald (1914–2002), American World War II fighter ace
- Linious "Mac" McGee (1897–1988), Alaskan aviation pioneer and founder of McGee Airways

== See also ==
- All pages with titles beginning with Mac
- All pages with titles containing Mac
- Mac (disambiguation)
- Big Mac (disambiguation)
- Johnny Mac (disambiguation)
- Little Mac (disambiguation)
- Mack (given name)
- Ian McCulloch (singer) (born 1959), lead singer of the English band Echo & The Bunnymen, nicknamed "Mac the Mouth"
