= Big Mac (nickname) =

Big Mac is a nickname of:

- Enzo Maccarinelli (born 1980), Welsh former professional boxer
- Jimmy Macullar (1855–1924), American Major League Baseball player
- Robert MacPherson (BMX rider) (born 1971), retired BMX rider
- Massimo Maccarone (born 1979), Italian footballer
- Alex McDonald (prospector) (1859–1909), Canadian gold prospector who made and lost a fortune in the Klondike
- John McEnroe (born 1959), retired professional tennis player
- Mark McGwire (born 1963), retired Major League Baseball player
- Jamie McMurray (born 1976), auto racing driver

== See also ==
- Big Mac (disambiguation)
- Little Mac (disambiguation)
- Mac (disambiguation)
