= MAK =

MAK may refer to:

== Places ==
- Malakal Airport IATA code
- MaK Motoren GmbH, German division of Caterpillar Inc. with headquarters in Hamburg
- Makerere University (MAK), a Uganda's largest and second-oldest higher institution of learning
- MAK Historic District (Decatur), the first locally designated historic district in Decatur, Georgia
- Museum für angewandte Kunst Frankfurt, Museum of Applied Arts, Frankfurt
- Museum für angewandte Kunst Wien, Museum of Applied Arts, Vienna

== People ==
- M. A. Khan (1920–2001), Indian politician
- Mahafarid Amir Khosravi (1969–2014), Iranian businessman
- Mahboob Ali Khan (1866–1911), 6th Nizam of Hyderabad
- Mahmood Ahmad Khan, Pakistani politician
- Mahmoud Abdel Khalek (born 1938), Lebanese politician
- Maimul Ahsan Khan (born 1954), Bangladeshi scholar
- Mairaj Ahmad Khan (born 1975)
- Makhdoom Ali Khan (born 1954), practising Senior Advocate Supreme Court
- Malak Azmat Khan, Pakistani politician
- Malik Ahmad Khan (born 1971), Pakistani politician
- Malik Aitbar Khan (born 1953), Pakistani politician
- Malik Alaudin Khan, the Jagirdar of Tijara
- Malik Allahyar Khan (1927–2008), parliamentarian from Pakistan
- Mansur Ali Khan (disambiguation), several
- Manzoor Ahmed Kakar (born 1971), Pakistani politician
- Manzoor Ali Khan (1922–1980), Sindhi classical singer
- Mar Aprim Khamis, Assyrian Church of the East bishop
- Marcus A. Kemp (1878–1957), American politician
- Margaret Anderson Kelliher (born 1968), American politician
- Maria Araújo Kahn, American judge
- Mario Alberto Kempes (born 1954), Argentinian footballer

== Organizations ==
- Interstate Aviation Committee, also known as MAK (based on the Russian acronym МАК)
- MAK Technologies, Inc., a software company
- Maktab al-Khidamat, the forerunner to al-Qaeda
- Maschinenbau Kiel, German industrial company now part of Vossloh; made railway locomotives
- MAT Macedonian Airlines, former national flag carrier airline of the Republic of Macedonia
- Mongolyn Alt Corporation, a Mongolian mining company
- Movement for the Autonomy of Kabylie, a political organization in Algeria

== Technology ==
- Media Access Key, used by TiVo digital video recorders
- Multiple Activation Key, or Volume license key (VLK), a type of activation key for Microsoft products

== Other uses ==
- Male germ cell-associated kinase, a human protein
- Maschinen Krieger (Ma. K ZBV3000), a science fiction universe created by Japanese artist and sculptor Kow Yokoyama
- Maximale Arbeitsplatz-Konzentration, a German expression corresponding to threshold limit value, which relates to safe daily exposure levels to chemical substances
- A male name, known in Bosnia and Herzegovina primarily as the nickname of the Bosnian poet "Mehmedalija Maka Dizdar".
- In South Sudan, makk was the title of king.
- In Hungarian language, makk means acorn.

== See also ==
- Mak (disambiguation)
- MAKS (disambiguation)
