= Mak =

Mak may refer to:

== People ==
- Alan Mak (director) (born 1968), Hong Kong film director
- Alan Mak (politician) (born 1984), British Member of Parliament
- Alice Mak, Chinese cartoonist and creator of McMug/McDull
- Geert Mak (born 1946), Dutch journalist, historian, and author
- Mak (surname), Cantonese form of the surname Mai
- Mak Dizdar (1917–1971), Bosnian poet
- Marion Wang Mak (born November 7, 1926), American composer
- Mateusz Mak (born 1991), Polish footballer
- Michał Mak (born 1991), Polish footballer
- Muhammad Arshad Khan, Pakistani painter popularly known as "MAK"
- Róbert Mak (born 1991), Slovak footballer

== Places ==
- Mak, Kardzhali Province, village in Bulgaria
- Mak, Masovian Voivodeship, village in Poland
- MAK, Museum of Applied Arts, Vienna, museum in Vienna, Austria

== Other ==
- The Mak language of Guizhou, China
- The Mak language of Nigeria
- Ma. K., abbreviation for the science-fiction universe Maschinen Krieger ZbV 3000
- Maksutov telescope, catadioptric telescope invented by Dmitri Maksutov
- MaK (Maschinenbau Kiel), German engineering firm in Kiel
- Movement for the Self-Determination of Kabylia, Kabyle political movement seeking self-government rule in Algeria
- Mak, alternative spelling of makk, a Sudanic royal title

== See also ==
- Mahk
- Makh
- MaK
- MAK (disambiguation)
- MAKS (disambiguation)
- Makk (disambiguation)
- Mac (disambiguation)
- Mach (disambiguation)
- Mack (disambiguation)
- Mark (disambiguation)
