= Macs =

Macs, MACS, etc. may refer to:

== Medicine ==
- Manual Ability Classification System, of manual dexterity in cerebral palsy
- Minimal Access Cranial Suspension, a form of facial surgery or rhytidectomy used to reduce wrinkles and lift sagging facial tissue
- Multicenter AIDS Cohort Study

== Science and technology ==
- Mac computers, a nickname for the Macintosh brand
- Magellanic Catalogue of Stars, a catalogue of positions for stars covering large areas around the Large and Small Magellanic Clouds
- Magnetic-activated cell sorting
- MAssive Cluster Survey, a survey of distant galaxy clusters that are very bright in X-ray
- Multi-purpose Arcade Combat Simulator, American marksmanship training software
- MACS (software), Model-based Analysis of ChIP-Seq, software for finding peaks in ChIP-Seq data used in computational biology

== Other ==
- Mac's Convenience Stores, a chain of stores in Canada
- "macs" (short story), by Terry Bisson
- Metropolitan Area Commuter System, a bus system in Fairbanks, Alaska, US
- Mountain Ash Comprehensive School, in Wales

== See also ==
- Macks Creek, Missouri
- Mac (disambiguation)
- Max (disambiguation)
- Macx (disambiguation)
- Macs (disambiguation)
- MAKS (disambiguation)
