= Tin Oo (auditor-general) =

Burmese military officer

- တင်ဦး
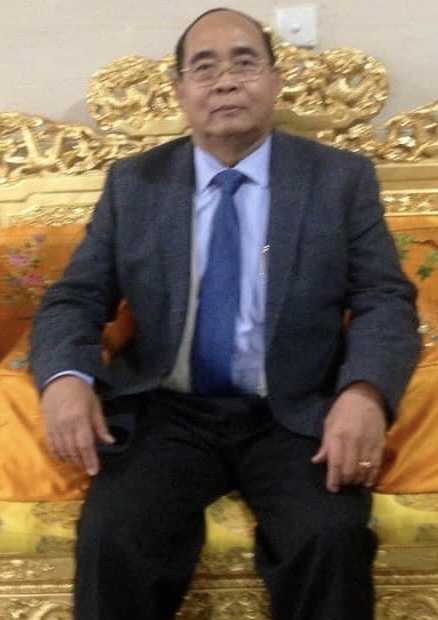

Union Auditor General of Myanmar
- Incumbent
- Assumed office 19 August 2022
- Leader: Min Aung Hlaing
- Preceded by: Kan Zaw

Chairman of the Anti-Corruption Commission of Myanmar
- In office 20 February 2021 – 19 August 2022
- Succeeded by: Than Swe

Personal details
- Born: 24 November 1952 (age 73) Letpadan Township, Pegu, Burma
- Party: Union Solidarity and Development Party
- Education: Defence Services Academy

Military service
- Allegiance: Myanmar
- Branch/service: Myanmar Army

Tin Oo (Burmese: တင်ဦး) is a former Burmese military officer and currently serves as the Union Auditor General of Myanmar.

== Early life and education ==
Tin Oo was born in Letpadan Township, Pegu, Burma (now Bago Region, Myanmar) on 24 November 1952. He graduated from the 28th batch of the Defence Services Academy.

== Military career ==
In the aftermath of the 2021 Myanmar coup d'état, the military junta appointed Tin Oo as the chairman of the Anti-Corruption Commission of Myanmar, a post he held from 20 February 2021 to 19 August 2022. In January 2022, the American, Canadian, and British governments sanctioned Tin Oo for his role in bringing politically motivated corruption charges against members of Myanmar's deposed civilian-led government, including Aung San Suu Kyi.

On 19 August 2022, he was appointed as Union Auditor General by the military junta, succeeding Kan Zaw.

== See also ==
- 2021 Myanmar coup d'etat
- State Administration Council
- Tatmadaw
