= Amax =

Amax or AMAX may refer to:

- AMAX, an American radio broadcasting certification program
- Amax Engineering, a defunct Australian aircraft manufacturer based in Donvale, Victoria
- American Metal Company, which became AMAX in 1957
- Photosynthetic capacity (A_{max})
- Amax Esporte Clube, Brazilian football club

== See also ==
- Alpha max (disambiguation), sometimes written "α max"
- AMEX (disambiguation)
- Max (disambiguation)
