= Mack =

Mack may refer to:

== People ==
- Mack (given name)
- Mack (surname)
- Reinhold Mack, German record producer and sound engineer, often credited as simply "Mack"
- Richard Machowicz (1965–2017), host of FutureWeapons and Deadliest Warrior, known as "Mack"

== Places ==
=== United States ===
- Mack, Colorado, an unincorporated town
- Mack, Louisiana, an unincorporated community
- Mack, Minnesota, an unincorporated town
- Mack, Ohio, a census-designated place

=== Bahamas ===
- Mack Town

== Businesses ==
- Mack Trucks, an American truck maker
- Mack Group, an American corporation providing contract manufacturing
- Mack Brewery, a Norwegian brewery
- Mack Rides, a German ride manufacturer
- Mack Air, a Botswana air charter line
- Mack (publishing), an art and photography publishing house based in London

== Other uses ==
- USS Mack (DE-358), a destroyer escort which served in World War II
- Mack (naval architecture), in naval architecture, a structure combining a ship's radar masts and funnels
- The Mack, a 1973 blaxploitation film
- Mack Park, original home field of the Detroit Stars Negro National League baseball franchise
- Mack (Cars), a film character

== See also ==
- Macks Creek, Missouri, USA;
- Macks Peak
- Mac (disambiguation)
- Mach (disambiguation)
- Mak (disambiguation)
- Mark (disambiguation)
