= Macx =

Macx or variations may refer to:

- Macx Davies (born 1992) Canadian biathlete
- Manfred Macx, a fictional character from Charles Stross 2005 novel Accelerando
- Mac OS X, Apple Macintosh computer operating system

== See also ==
- Mach 10 (disambiguation)
- Mac (disambiguation)
- Max (disambiguation)
- Macs (disambiguation)
- MAKS (disambiguation)
- machx, a mountain biking trail in Pantperthog
- Mach-X (Marvel Comics), comic book superhero alter-ego of Marvel Comics character Abner Jenkins
- Mack 10, rapper Dedrick D'Mon Rolison
- Mac-10, rapper Phillip Allen
- MAC-10 submachine gun
