= Max (surname) =

Max is a surname. Notable people with the surname include:

== The Max family of artists ==
NB: two members of this family were knighted (Ritter is German for "knight"), both by Emperor Franz Joseph of Austria: Emanuel Max in 1876 as Ritter von Wachstein and Gabriel Max in 1900 as Ritter von Max, hence their more complicated surnames.

- Emanuel Max von Wachstein (1810–1901), German-Czech sculptor, brother of Josef, and uncle of Gabriel
- Gabriel von Max (1840–1915), Austrian painter, son of Josef, and nephew of Emanuel
- Josef Max (1804–1855), German-Czech sculptor, brother of Emanuel, and father of Gabriel

== Others ==
- Adolphe Max (1869–1939), Belgian politician
- Augusto Max (born 1992), Argentine footballer
- Ava Max (born 1994), American singer and songwriter
- Édouard de Max (1869-1924), Romanian-French stage actor and son of Emil Max
- Emil Max (1834-1894), Romanian physician
- Karl Max, Prince Lichnowsky (1860–1928), was a German diplomat during July Crisis and later Czechs political writer
- Martin Max (born 1968), German footballer
- Peter Max (1937–2026), American artist
- Philipp Max (born 1993), German football and son of Martin Max
- Tucker Max (born 1975), American author

== Fictional characters ==
- High Max, recurring antagonist from Rock Man X6
- Montana Max, from the animated TV series Tiny Toon Adventures
