= Kan Zaw =

Burmese politician (born 1954)

H.E. Kan Zaw
- ကံဇော်
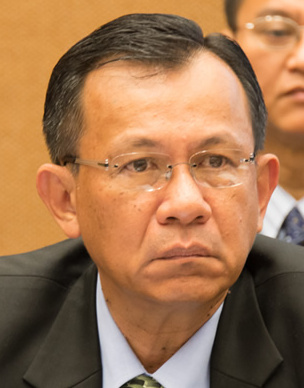
- Kan Zaw in 2013

Union Minister of Ministry of Investment and Foreign Economic Relations
- Incumbent
- Assumed office 19 August 2022
- Preceded by: Aung Naing Oo

Union Auditor General
- In office 3 February 2021 – 19 August 2022
- Preceded by: Maw Than
- Succeeded by: Tin Oo

Minister for National Planning and Economic Development
- In office September 2012 – 30 March 2016

Deputy Minister for National Planning and Economic Development
- In office March 2011 – September 2012
- Succeeded by: Sett Aung, Khin San Yi, Le Le Thein

Rector of Yangon Institute of Economics
- In office 2000–2011
- Preceded by: Maw Than
- Succeeded by: Khin San Yi

Personal details
- Born: 11 October 1954 (age 71) Salin Township, Magwe Division, Burma
- Children: Khine Ngwe Hnin Zaw
- Education: Yangon Institute of Economics, International Institute of Social Studies
- Occupation: Economist

Kan Zaw (Burmese: ကံဇော်, born 11 October 1954) is a Burmese politician who was the Union Minister of the now defunct Ministry of Investment and Foreign Economic Relations. He previously served as Union Auditor General under Min Aung Hlaing. He was the Minister for National Planning and Economic Development of Myanmar from September 2012 to March 2016. From March 2011 to September 2012, he served as its deputy minister.

== Early life and education ==
Kan Zaw was born on 11 October 1954 in Salin Township, Magwe Division, Burma (now Magwe Region, Myanmar). He received a Bachelor of Economics at the Yangon Institute of Economics, and graduated from the International Institute of Social Studies in 1984 from a Master of Art in Regional Development Planning. Kan Zaw also holds a Doctorate in Literature.

== Career ==
Kan Zaw has had a long career with the Yangon Institute of Economics, having served as a professor, department head and ultimately as rector.

In February 2021, in the aftermath of the 2021 Myanmar coup d'état, the military junta, the State Administration Council, appointed Kan Zaw as Union Auditor General, replacing Maw Than. After accepting the military appointment, Kan Zaw's family became the target of a social punishment campaign. In November 2021, the ASEAN Federation of Accountants (AFA) conference courted controversy for inviting Kan Zaw as a "guest of honour." In response, several accounting bodies, including the Institute of Management Accountants and Japanese Institute of Certified Public Accountants withdrew from the conference.

In November 2022, the European Union imposed sanctions on Kan Zaw as part of a targeted economic and travel sanction effort on Burmese junta officials.

== Personal life ==
Kan Zaw is married, and has three children, including Khine Ngwe Hnin Zaw.
