= Mad Mex =

Mad Mex may refer to:

- Mad Mex (Australia), a Sydney-based Australian fast-food restaurant chain
- Mad Mex (Pennsylvania), a Pittsburgh-based Pennsylvanian fast-food restaurant chain founded in 1993

== See also ==
- Mad Max (disambiguation)
