= AMEC (disambiguation) =

AMEC may refer to:

- Amec Foster Wheeler, a global consultancy, engineering and project management company headquartered in London, UK
- Association of Mining & Exploration Companies, the trade association for companies mining in Australia
- African Methodist Episcopal Church, a predominantly African-American Methodist denomination based in the US
- Advanced Micro-Fabrication Equipment, an Asia-based manufacturer of microfabrication equipment for the semiconductor and adjacent industries
- Arctic Military Environmental Cooperation, a joint Norwegian, Russian, and American government consortium (later joined by the British) to deal with military environmental issues, mainly the decommissioning of Russian nuclear-powered vessels
- Afro-Middle East Centre, a Johannesburg-based think tank with a Middle East focus

== See also ==
- AMEX (disambiguation)
