= Big Mac (disambiguation) =

A Big Mac is a hamburger from the fast food chain McDonald's.

Big Mac may also refer to:

== Arts, entertainment, and media ==
=== Fictional entities ===
- Big Mac (Casualty), a character from the UK medical drama Casualty
- Big Mac (McDonald's character), an advertising character from the fictional McDonaldland world
- Big Mac (TUGS), a character from the children's television series TUGS
- Big Macintosh or Big Mac, a recurring character in the cartoon series My Little Pony: Friendship is Magic

=== Other arts, entertainment, and media ===
- Big Mac (computer game), a series on the Commodore 64 platform
- "Big Mac" (M*A*S*H), an episode of the TV series M*A*S*H
- The Baseball Encyclopedia, also known as The MacMillan Baseball Encyclopedia or Big Mac, a 1969 reference work

== Computing and technology ==
- Big Mac (supercomputer), a supercomputer created by Virginia Tech in 2003
- Big Mac (computer), a cancelled workstation computer designed by Apple Computer in 1985
- Big Media Access Control, a 100 Mbit Ethernet adapter used in Sun Microsystems workstations and servers

== Structures ==
- Daniel Carter Beard Bridge, a span crossing the Ohio River, U.S.
- Mackinac Bridge, a span connecting the peninsulas of Michigan, U.S.
- McNichols Sports Arena, an indoor facility in Denver, Colorado, U.S.
- Oklahoma State Penitentiary, a prison in McAlester, Oklahoma, U.S.

== Other uses ==
- Big Mac (nickname), a list of people with the nickname
- Big Mac Index
- McMillan TAC-50 sniper rifle
- Municipal Assistance Corporation, which dealt with the New York City fiscal crisis of the 1970s
- USS McCaffery (DD-860), a US Navy destroyer nicknamed "Big Mac"

== See also ==
- Big Mack (disambiguation)
- Little Mac (disambiguation)
- Mac (disambiguation)
- "Little Big Mac", an internal name for Apple's Macintosh II project
