= MAKS =

MAKS or Maks may refer to:

== People ==
- Maksim (Maks), a Slavic given name
- Kees Maks (1876-1967) Dutch painter

== Places ==
- Maks, a settlement in northern Poland

== Other uses ==
- MAKS Air Show, an international airshow held near Moscow, Russia
- MAKS (spacecraft), a canceled Russian air-launched orbiter project

== See also ==
- Macks Creek, Missouri, USA;
- MAK (disambiguation)
- Mak (disambiguation)
- Max (disambiguation)
- Macx (disambiguation)
- Macs (disambiguation)
