= Mach 10 =

Mach 10 or variation, may refer to:

- Mach number for ten times the speed of sound
  - Hypersonic speed of 10 times the speed of sound
- Mach 10 Training Systems, a coaching consultancy of James McCallum (cyclist)
- "Mach 10" (song), a 2007 song by Dub Pistols off the album Speakers and Tweeters
- MachTen, a Unix-like operating system based on BSD and the Mach microkernel
- Mach-X, a comic book superhero alter-ego of Marvel Comics character Abner Jenkins
- machx, a mountain biking trail in Pantperthog

== See also ==
- Mac-10, rapper Phillip Allen; see Totally Insane
- MAC-10 submachine gun
- Mach (disambiguation)
- Mack 10 (born 1971), rapper Dedrick D'Mon Rolison
- Macx (disambiguation)
