= Corruption in Myanmar =

Corruption in Myanmar is among the worst in the world. Owing to failures in regulation and enforcement, corruption flourishes in every sector of government and business. Many foreign businesspeople consider corruption "a serious barrier to investment and trade in Myanmar." A U.N. survey in May 2014 concluded that corruption is the greatest hindrance to business in Myanmar. The ongoing civil war has significantly set back anti-corruption efforts, exacerbating the problem.

Transparency International's 2025 Corruption Perceptions Index, which scored 182 countries on a scale from 0 ("highly corrupt") to 100 ("very clean"), gave Myanmar a score of 16. When ranked by score, Myanmar ranked 169th among the 182 countries in the Index, where the country ranked first is perceived to have the most honest public sector. For comparison with regional scores, the best score among those countries of the Asia Pacific region that appeared in the Index (Note: Afghanistan, Australia, Bangladesh, Bhutan, Brunei Darussalam, Cambodia, China, Fiji, Hong Kong, India, Indonesia, Japan, North Korea, South Korea, Laos, Malaysia, Maldives, Mongolia, Myanmar, Nepal, New Zealand, Pakistan, Papua New Guinea, Philippines, Singapore, Solomon Islands, Sri Lanka, Taiwan, Thailand, Timor-Leste, Vanuatu, Vietnam) was 84, the average score was 45 and the worst score was 15. For comparison with worldwide scores, the best score was 89 (ranked 1), the average score was 42, and the worst score was 9 (ranked 181, in a two-way tie).

In the Myanmar Business Survey 2014, corruption was the most frequently identified obstacle to business, especially with respect to obtaining firm registration, business licenses and permits from government authorities.

It is common in Myanmar to charge illicit payments for government services, to bribe tax collectors to secure a lower tax payment, and to bribe customs officials to avoid paying customs duties.

== Background ==
=== Saffron Revolution ===
In 2007 the then-Burmese government revoked several subsidies for various fuel industries, causing prices to soar throughout the nation. This sparked widespread protests due to the public's dissatisfaction with the military government. It was noted that the average citizen was displeased with the immense levels of kleptocracy in the nation, allowing members of the military dictatorship to live in a "state within a state" with accumulated wealth far beyond that of the people. The government reacted harshly to the protests through violence and arbitrary detentions. While the official death count tallied thirteen killed, it is widely surmised that the true number far exceeded this figure. The government had even taken steps to censor internet access within the country, though to no avail.

Although the demonstrations were dispersed and suppressed by the military junta, the public would later vote for a new government and wrest power from Senior General Than Shwe by 2011. Nonetheless, elements of the military government retained power.

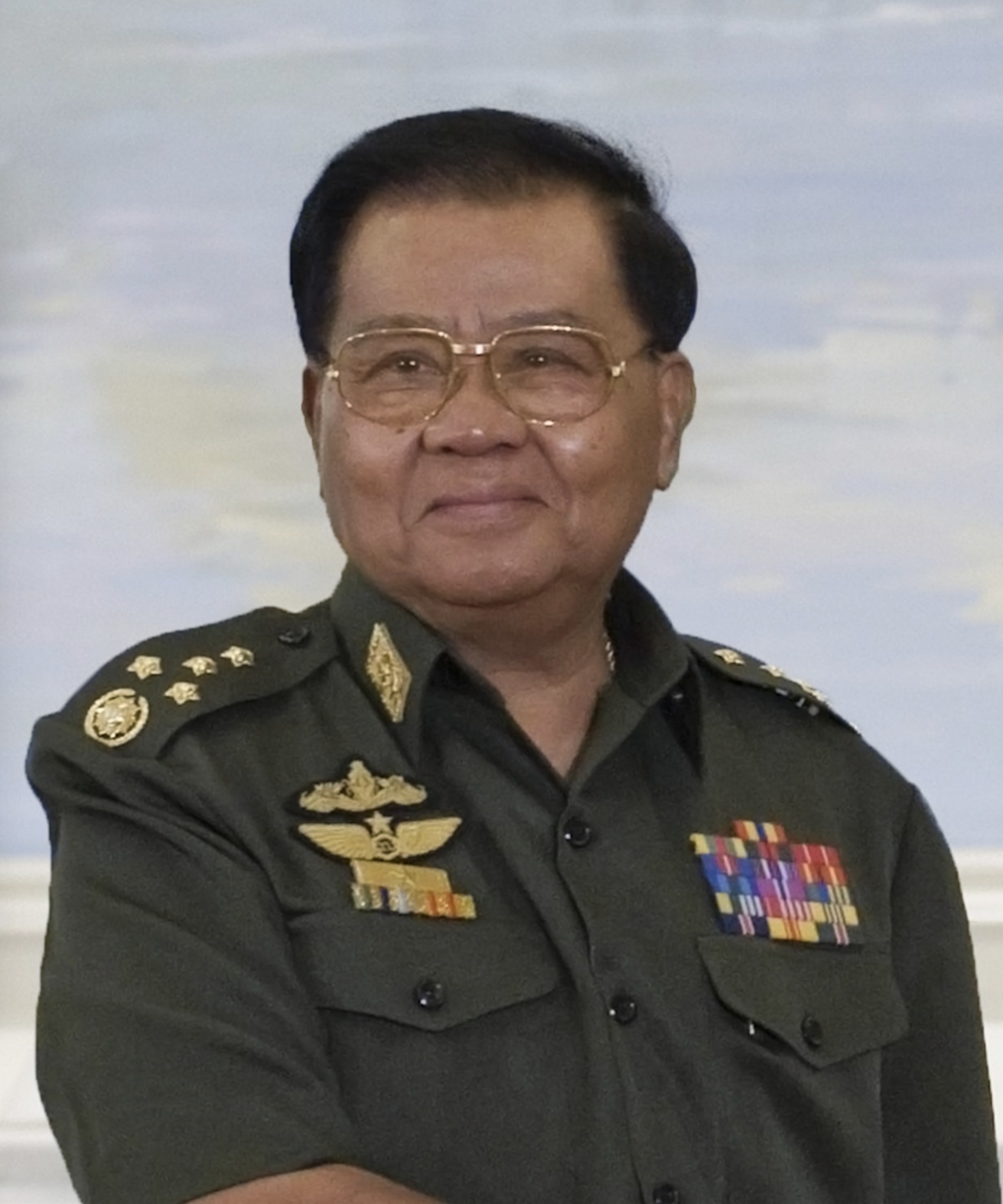
Former Burmese Head of State Senior General Than Shwe

Myanmar spent five decades under military rule. This period ended in 2011, when a semi-civilian government took power and sought to regenerate the economy and draw foreign investment. Among its objectives was the reduction of endemic corruption. As of May 2014, however, those reforms were viewed as having had a minimal effect on corruption.

Every leading official in the former military regime is said to have "committed thousands of offenses related to corruption." Most high-level officials in the civil service were related to military officials.

Since the end of military rule, Myanmar has been implementing economic reforms and developing a free market, but according to one source, "its nascent market economy remains bound by myriads of regulations," which make possible rampant corruption that "hinders the functioning of the price mechanism, upon which the proper functioning of the market economy is based." Kim Ninh of the Asia Foundation said in May 2015 that despite efforts to reduce corruption after military rule, the country's business environment remained essentially the same, with few new companies emerging since 2011.

An October 2015 article in Wired stated that, notwithstanding attempts by the US and other Western countries to promote transparency, the majority of Myanmar's economy remains in control of a corrupt elite. During the privatization process, according to a report by the U4 Anti-Corruption Resource Centre that was updated in October 2014, "numerous state assets were sold to the military, family members, and associates of senior government officials at fire sale prices."

According to several reports, moreover, the military influenced the results of the 2010 and 2012 elections by means of fraud, restrictions on political participation, and prohibition of international monitoring.

=== 2021 coup ===
Since the 2021 military coup in Myanmar and the rise of the military-led State Administration Council (SAC), corruption has worsened across the country. Anti-corruption laws are enforced selectively, predominantly against the SAC's political opposition and those who have fallen out of favour with the regime.

In 2021, Myanmar's Corruption Perceptions Index (CPI) was 28 (scored out of 100); it fell to 23 in 2022, and was 16 in 2025. This was the lowest score for any country in Southeast Asia.

=== Factors ===
Some reasons for the high levels of corruption in Myanmar include multiple exchange rates, which enable officials to demand bribes for providing favorable rates; low civil-service pay rates; and a tradition of nepotism. "As there are no competitive selection processes to enter the public sector," notes one report, "personal connections and bribery are maybe more important than qualifications. For instance, it is common practice to select ministers and high-level civil servants from the military ranks rather than based on expertise."

It has been observed that post-2011 Myanmar has an expanding informal economy, and that such economies are notoriously vulnerable to corruption.

== Political and judicial corruption ==
=== Political corruption ===
Political corruption exists at higher levels of government, and comes into play especially "when large infrastructural works or other 'mega-projects' are being negotiated or implemented." Companies pay bribes "to avoid trouble or delays," and often "establish illicit networks of patronage which can be exploited in future deals." Companies that establish such networks "are often given monopoly control over the markets or sectors they win by 'bidding,'" and this monopoly control stifles competition and growth.

In the World Economic Forum's Global Competitiveness Report 2013–2014, business executives rated the incidence of corrupt diversion of public funds to companies, individuals, or groups at 2.3 on a 7-point scale (1 being "very common" and 7 "never occurs"). They rated the favoritism of government officials towards well-connected companies and individuals, as reflected in policies and contracts, a score of 2.2 on a 7-point scale (1 meaning "always show favouritism" and 7 "never show favouritism").

Government ministries often fail to report their own expenditures on projects.

=== Judiciary ===
The judiciary is corrupt and subject to government and military influence. Judiciary officials in Myanmar accept bribes for various services, such as providing access to detainees and rendering a favorable verdict. Judiciary corruption "represents a major challenge to businesspeople looking to do business in Myanmar." In disputes with foreign firms, local businesses can use bribes to secure favorable judgments. On the World Economic Forum's 2013–14 Global Competitiveness Report, business executives rate the independence of the judiciary at 2.8 on a 7-point scale (1 being "heavily influenced" and 7 "entirely independent").

Judicial decisions about land and buildings are often affected by government influence, personal relationships, and bribery. It can take years to enforce a contract in the Myanmar courts.

=== Lobbying groups ===
There are many lobbying groups in Myanmar, but they are unregulated, and "regularly resort to bribes and concessions to secure favor," which is "abetted by the lack of transparency and accountability in Myanmar."

== Law enforcement and security corruption ==
=== Police and security forces ===
On the World Economic Forum's 2013–14 Global Competitiveness Report, business executives scored the reliability of police services to enforce law and order at 3.0 on a 7-point scale (1 being "cannot be relied upon at all" and 7 being "can always be relied upon").

Police officers "reportedly often ask victims of crimes to pay substantial amounts to ensure police investigate crimes; in addition, police routinely extort money from civilians." Police are said to be involved in human trafficking, accepting bribes from drug lords, and extorting local businessmen. When a curfew was imposed following riots that took place in Mandalay in 2004, police extorted bribes from people who wanted to break the curfew.

One reason for police corruption is that police officers were expected for many years to pay for their own investigations, without any reimbursement or compensation. This policy not only encouraged corruption but also discouraged serious investigation of crimes.

Security forces "generally act with impunity in Myanmar." The Human Rights Report 2013 noted that a police escort for a UN rapporteur's convoy "stood by" while the convoy was attacked.

=== Drugs ===
Myanmar is one of the world's four major producers of opium and heroin. The government has expanded counter-narcotic efforts, but is "reluctant to investigate, arrest, and prosecute high-level international traffickers," according to the CIA.

== Economic and resource exploitation ==
=== Jade industry ===
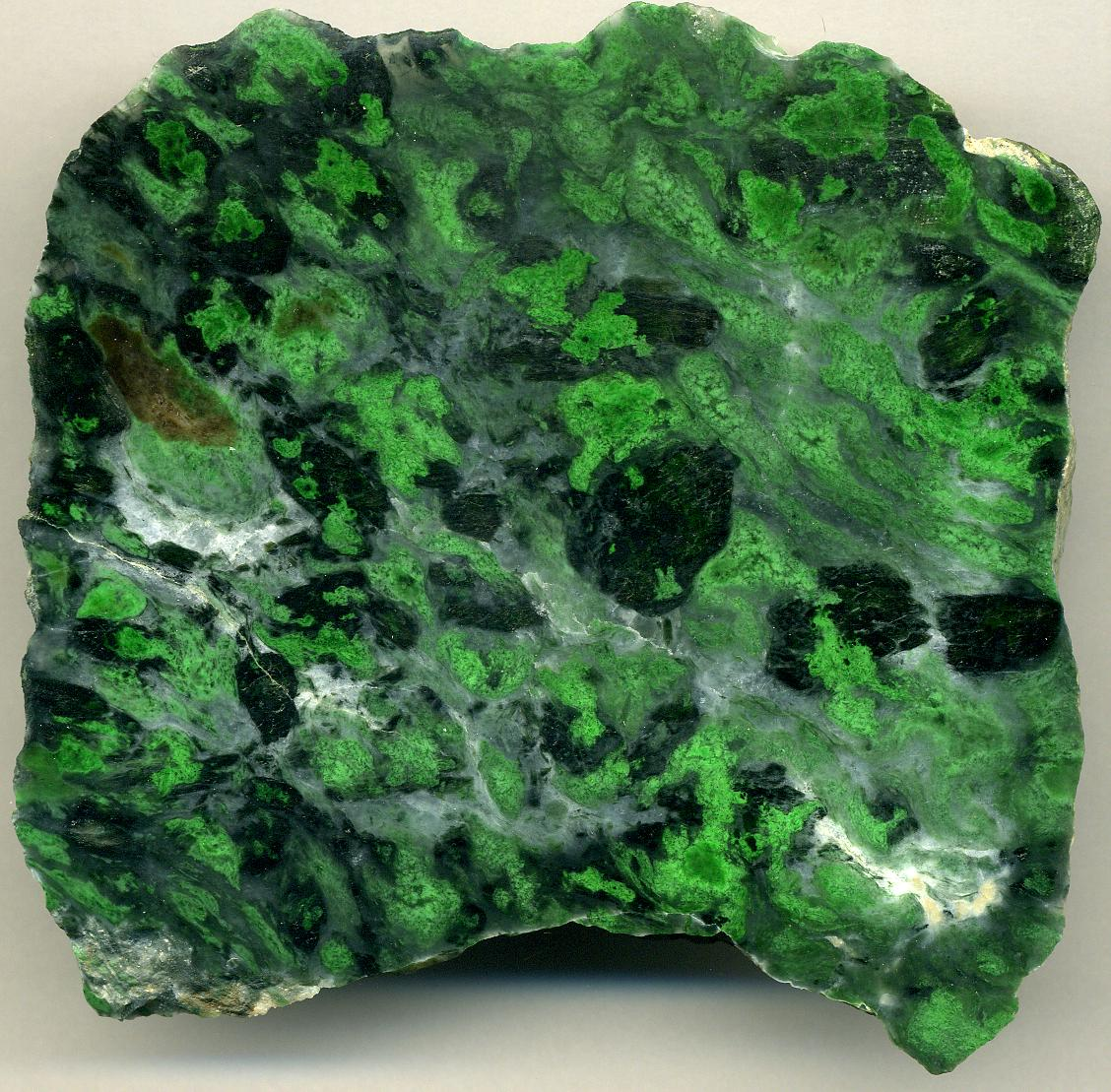
Jade mined in Myanmar

The jade trade accounts for 48% of Myanmar's official GDP. An October 2015 report by Global Witness noted that Myanmar's jade industry is exploited by the nation's elites, including military leaders, drug traffickers, and business leaders. This was the finding of a year-long investigation entitled "Jade: Myanmar's 'Big State Secret,'" which identified that several leading members of the nation's government and economy had siphoned US$31 billion worth of jade in 2014, a figure nearly half of Myanmar's economy.

Global Witness estimated that illegal networks in Myanmar had stolen a total of US$122.8 billion worth of jade over the previous decade, and claimed that Myanmar's jade industry is possibly the greatest natural resource racket in recent history. In addition, the nearly one hundred active jade mining deposits are located in areas controlled by about 10 to 15 military-connected businessmen, and as a result, the people living in those areas remain in poverty while a few businessmen profit greatly.

=== Logging ===
As of 2006, illegal logging accounted for at least half of the logging in the country. The smuggling of timber across the Chinese border is a major activity.

=== Land ===
Under the military government, which ruled Myanmar until 2011, land was nationalized. According to an October 2015 report in The Wall Street Journal, land in Myanmar remains largely under the control of the military and their allies. In addition, allegations of forced evictions are still common across Myanmar.

== Business and financial corruption ==
=== Business sector ===
"The problem of corruption in Myanmar is particularly severe in the area of business activity," states one source. A firm wishing a construction permit must go through an application process involving (on average) 16 procedures, a 159-day wait, and a cost of about 567% of income per capita. A firm wishing to get electricity must undergo 5 procedures, wait 91 days, and spend over 3000% of income per capita.

In the Myanmar Business Survey 2014, corruption was the most frequently named obstacle to doing business in the country. In 2014's Ease of Doing Business ranking, Myanmar was also ranked very low.

According to the Investment Climate Statement 2014, "Investors may experience corruption when seeking investment permits or when leasing land in Myanmar." The Enterprise Surveys 2014 reported that 38.9% of businesspeople were "expected to give gifts to get an operating licence," while 55.8% were expected "to give a gift to get an electrical connection," and 30.1% were "expected to give gifts to secure a water connection." Persons applying for import and export licences are also likely to be charged illegal fees.

Without notice or external review, Myanmar's government routinely promulgates new regulations and laws affecting foreign investors.

Daniel Barrins of the Herbert Smith Freehills law firm, a partner of Australia-based Asialink, has said that corruption is denying Myanmar's citizens the benefits of foreign investment. Problems with land ownership, intellectual property rights, and the rule of law all create difficulties for potential foreign investors, according to Barrins.

=== Taxation ===
Taxes are collected irregularly. Over one-third of respondents to a survey said they were expected to give gifts in meetings with tax officials. A medium-sized company doing business in Myanmar must make 31 separate tax payments annually. On average, this takes 155 hours work and involves a tax payment amounting to 48.9% of annual profits.

In April 2014, a new Union Taxation Law came into effect. It is designed to help eliminate corruption in tax collection.

On 14 June 2025, the anti-SAC Wetlet Township People's Administration faced protests for high tolls. Protestors also stated that although the National Unity Government authorized only 2 toll checkpoints, militia groups ran multiple other toll checkpoints.

=== Import, export, and customs officials ===
Myanmar's import and export regulations are not transparent. According to the Global Enabling Trade 2014, corruption at the border and burdensome procedures are among the major challenges to the importation of goods. Business executives gave the efficiency and transparency of border administration in Myanmar a score of 2.2 on a 7-point scale (1 being "non-transparent" and 7 "transparent"). Myanmar ranks 128th out of 138 countries in this regard.

Businesses must bribe customs officials in order to avoid high import and export taxes. 53.5% of businesses surveyed in 2014 said that they expected to give "gifts" to obtain import licences.

On average, exporting a container of goods from Myanmar involves 9 documents, takes 25 days, and costs US$670. On average, importing a container of goods into Myanmar involves 9 documents, takes 27 days, and costs US$660.

== Public services and civil society suppression ==
=== Media suppression ===
Myanmar’s military government has severely restricted press freedom since seizing power in February 2021, making it one of the world’s worst jailers of journalists. Photojournalist Sai Zaw Thaike, arrested in May 2023 while reporting on Cyclone Mocha, has reportedly faced daily torture in Insein Prison for exposing human rights abuses. He was sentenced to 20 years under various laws, including sedition and incitement. Myanmar Now, the independent news agency he worked for, alleges that authorities targeted him for revealing prison abuses and criticizing the regime. Reports indicate that other political prisoners have suffered similar mistreatment. International organizations, including the U.N. and the Committee to Protect Journalists, have condemned the junta's actions. Since the coup, at least 172 journalists have been arrested, and press freedoms remain under assault.

== Property and everyday corruption ==
=== Petty corruption ===
Petty corruption, meaning the extortion of small bribes or "gifts" in connection with everyday services, is "endemic to the everyday life of Myanmar citizens. It is particularly prevalent when citizens deal with the bureaucracy of the country and engage with low- to mid-level public officials." It is common "in application processes for permits or documents, where bribes or gift-giving end up becoming unavoidable elements of the process, perhaps even becoming culturally engrained[,] with bribery rather being seen as gift-giving or a kind gesture." Since gifts up to 300,000 Kyat (US$300) are not legally regarded as corruption, there are no penalties for this kind of activity, even though it "represents a huge cost for the government, undermines trust in state institutions, and violates the principle of equal treatment of citizens."

Since late August 2024, illegal trishaw drivers have frequently joined junta militia groups to circumvent petrol restrictions and avoid inspections.

=== Buying property ===
Business executives rate the protection of property rights and financial assets at 2.5 on a 7-point scale (1 being "very weak" and 7 "very strong"). Registering property involves an average of 6 procedures, a 113-day wait, and a cost amounting to 7.2% of the property's value.

== Anti-corruption efforts ==
While Myanmar was still under military control, its Central Bank implemented controls in accordance with the IMF's Anti-Money Laundering/Combating the Financing of Terrorism (AML/CFT) guidelines. As a result, Myanmar was removed from the International Financial Action Task Force's list of "Non-cooperative Countries and Territories" in October 2006.

President Thein Sein has introduced a number of policies intended to reduce corruption in business. A key theme of his inaugural speech on 30 March 2011 was fighting government corruption. He said that "democracy will [be] promoted only hand in hand with good governance. That is why our government responsible for Myanmar's democratic transition will try hard to shape good administrative machinery... We will fight corruption in cooperation with the people as it harms the image of not only the offenders, but also the nation and the people." Thein Sein has reportedly made "significant efforts to minimise corruption in the extractive industries" in hopes of attracting foreign investment.

In August 2012, an anti-bribery bill was approved. In August 2013, an Anti-Corruption Law was passed.

In April 2013, several senior government officials charged with corruption were compelled to retire or leave departments working on investment.

The Myanmar Centre for Responsible Business (MCRB) was founded in 2013. It seeks to promote "more responsible business practices in Myanmar." An MCRB initiative called Transparency in Myanmar Enterprise (TiME) "publishes information about anti-corruption, organizational transparency, and concern for human rights, health, and the environment among the largest businesses in Myanmar. Using criteria laid out by Transparency International the project has produced rankings of companies according to the above criteria by analyzing information they post online."

Anti-corruption laws "were further amended in 2014 to allow for the parliament to establish a committee to investigate allegations of corruption among government officials." The Anti-Corruption Commission of Myanmar was established in February 2014. It focuses mainly on bribery, which can be punished by fines and up to fifteen years in prison. By December 2014, it had received almost 600 written complaints, but had addressed only three, saying that it could not act without documented evidence. MP U Ye Tun stated that the commission did not have the authority to take action effectively. An expert in governance and anti-corruption stated in December 2014 that the commission would be unlikely to target the government or its ministries, which is where the bulk of corruption in Myanmar takes place.

A February 2014 report said that the Myanmar Police Force (MPF) had improved its ability to identify and acknowledge corruption. In 2013, the MPF arrested two senior police officers for involvement in drug smuggling.

In July 2014, Myanmar became an Extractive Industries Transparency Initiative (EITI) candidate country. Myanmar was thereby agreeing to increase transparency in its extractive industries, notably the logging industry.

The Money Laundering Eradication Law (2015) provides for the recovery of funds tied to illicit or criminal activities. The Anti-Money Laundering Rules, the establishment of a special police unit for financial crimes, and the passage of Rules Combating the Financing of Terrorism also aid the struggle against corruption. The Financial Institutions of Myanmar Law and the Foreign Exchange Management Law both criminalize fraud and other crimes committed in financial institutions. Myanmar's Competition Law allows for the prosecution of anti-competitive business activities. Prosecution under these laws, however, is relatively rare, owing largely to a lack of governmental resources.

In October 2015, Aung San Suu Kyi, the Nobel Peace Prize winner and opposition leader, said in a speech that she had looked to Singapore for advice on combatting corruption in her own country, due to Singapore's incredibly low levels of corruption.

In Myanmar, Coca-Cola adopted a policy of zero-tolerance for corruption at its facilities and trucking routes. All drivers of Coca-Cola trucks carry an anti-corruption card stating that they are forbidden to bribe the traffic authorities and that they are required to report any solicitation of bribes to their supervisors. This procedure was initially met with resistance but over time has been respected by police.

Telenor has declared that it is "firmly opposed to corruption" and that it requires all parties in Myanmar working with Telenor Myanmar "to adhere to Telenor's Supplier Conduct Principles."

According to a survey report published in November 2020 by Transparency Networks, 93 percent of Myanmar citizens think the government is doing well in tackling corruption. The report was praised by local media and government officials.

== See also ==
- Crime in Myanmar
- Anti-Corruption Commission of Myanmar
- International Anti-Corruption Academy
- Group of States Against Corruption
- International Anti-Corruption Day
- ISO 37001 Anti-bribery management systems
- United Nations Convention against Corruption
- OECD Anti-Bribery Convention
- Transparency International
