= Myanmar Institute of Certified Public Accountants =

Professional organization

Myanmar Institute of Certified Public Accountants (Burmese: မြန်မာနိုင်ငံ လက်မှတ်ရ ပြည်သူ့စာရင်းကိုင်များအသင်း; abbreviated MICPA) is a professional body of Certified Public Accountants in Myanmar. It was first formed in 2003 (22 years ago) in association and permission of the Ministry of Home Affairs of Myanmar. The function of the body is to communicate with international accountancy bodies and to distribute information to its members. MICPA was founded under the Myanmar Accountancy Council (MAC), a policymaking body of accountants and auditors.

On June 13, 2013, the Institute of Chartered Accountants in England and Wales (ICAEW) signed a Memorandum of Understanding (MoU) with MICPA to work more closely together. The formal agreement was signed in Yangon, Myanmar by Mark Billington, the ICAEW South East Asia Regional Director, and U Wan Tin, the MICPA Chairman. It provides the foundation for MICPA and ICAEW to support each other and improve the accounting field in Myanmar.

On January 30, 2014, MICPA became an independent, non-profit corporate entity.

The main goals of MICPA are:

- To raise accounting standards up to international standards
- Gain worldwide acceptance of Burmese accounting standards and accounting professionals
- Further improve proficiency and skills of MICPA members
- Regulate members to ensure that the professional code and ethics is being followed accordingly.
- Attain more recognition for Myanmar accounting professions

On June 16, 2017, the World Bank issued the "Report on The Observance of Standards and Codes-Accounting and Auditing" with several recommendations, including the granting of the Myanmar Institute of Certified Public Accountants independence from the Myanmar Accountancy Council (MAC), the regulatory licensing body for the country's accountancy profession.

== Membership ==
=== Executive Committee Members ===
| Member | Position |
|---|---|
| U Wan Tin | Chairman |
| Dr. Tin Latt | Vice Chairman |
| U Moe Kyaw | Vice Chairman |
| U Aung Naing Maung Maung | Secretary |
| Daw Aye Thida | Treasurer |
| U Myat Noe Aung | Joint Secretary |
| U Kyaw Tin | Member |
| U Maung Maung Aung | Member |
| U Ye Yint Win | Member |
| U Aung Naing | Member |
| Daw Cho Cho Aung | |
