= Lun Maung =

Burmese military officer

General Lun Maung (Burmese: လွန်းမောင်) is a retired Burmese military officer who served as the Union Auditor General of Myanmar from 2003 to 28 August 2012. After retiring from his post, he ran a restaurant in Bilin Township, Mon State in July 2013, and kept a low profile. He is an outlier among retiring Burmese generals, many of whom leave office with rich business interests. Lun Maung is nicknamed as the "waiter general" by the media.

== Career ==
Lun Maung was born into an ethnic Shan family. He graduated from the 12th intake of the Defence Services Academy in the 1960s. During Than Shwe's military rule, Lun Maung served as both the military inspector general and the national auditor general. When President Thein Sein took office in 2011, he was reappointed auditor general but forced to retire in 2012. After his story became popular on social media, the government reoffered him a position, but he refused. In 2019, he became a senior member of the newly founded Democratic Party of National Politics (DNP), led by former military generals. Many believe the party was established at the instruction of former Senior General Than Shwe.
