= AMEX =

AMEX, AmEx or Amex may refer to:

- American Experience, a television program
- American Express, a global financial services corporation
  - Falmer Stadium, an association football stadium in Brighton, England known for sponsorship reasons as the American Express Community Stadium, better known as The Amex
- American Stock Exchange
- Union of American Exiles

== See also ==
- Amax (disambiguation)
- AMEC (disambiguation)
- Mex (disambiguation) ie. A mex
