= Mansur Khan =

Mansur Khan may refer to:

- Mansur Khan (qollar-aghasi), Safavid military commander
- Mansur Khan (Moghul Khan) (died 1543), khan of eastern Moghulistan
- Mansur Ali Khan (1830–1884), Nawab of Bengal
- Mansoor Khan (fl. 1988–2008), Indian film director and producer

== See also ==
- Mansur Ali Khan (disambiguation)
