= Maxx =

Maxx may refer to:

- MAXX (public transport brand), a public transport brand in Auckland, New Zealand
- MAXX, one of hotel brands of H World International
- Maxx (eurodance act), a German-based eurodance music project from the 1990s
- Maxxx (TV series), a Channel 4 sitcom/boyband satire created by O. T. Fagbenle
- Maxx, a girl character and one of the kids in the show The Dooley and Pals Show
- The Maxx, a comic book and animated character
- Maxx Crosby, an NFL player
- Maxx Force, a roller coaster at Six Flags Great America
- Maxx Mann, a singer in the Trans-Siberian Orchestra
- Maxx or Max Muscle, the wrestler John Czawlytko
- ProSieben Maxx, German television channel
- T.J. Maxx, a department store chain in the US
  - The Maxx (retail store), two defunct stores in Massachusetts operated by T.J. Maxx
- T.K. Maxx, a retail chain in Europe
- A line of radio-controlled vehicles from Traxxas, including the T-Maxx, SportMaxx, S-Maxx and E-Maxx
- Holden Captiva MaXX and Daewoo Winstorm MaXX, rebadging of the Opel Antara SUV

== See also ==
- Max (disambiguation)
- Maxxx, a defunct general entertainment channel for men
