= Myanmar Accountancy Council =

The Myanmar Accountancy Council (Burmese: မြန်မာနိုင်ငံစာရင်းကောင်စီ; abbreviated MAC) is the national professional accounting body of Burma (Myanmar). MAC began as the Burma Accountancy Council (BAC), which was enacted by the Revolutionary Council's 1972 Burma Accountancy Law (1972) on 12 January 1972. On 8 March 1994, the State Law and Order Restoration Council replaced the Accounting Law, which established an Office of the Auditor General of the Union (OAG) that acts as the Secretariat of the Myanmar Accountancy Council . MAC is the nation's conferring body for accountancy practice and licenses, including the Certified Public Accountant and Diploma in Accounting.

== See also ==
- Office of the Auditor General (Burma)
- Myanmar Institute of Certified Public Accountants
