= Emil Max =

Romanian physician

Emil Max (1834–1894) was a Romanian physician.

Born into a Jewish family in Botoșani, his father Iosif was an experienced accoucheur, with an 1832 degree from Pest University. Emil obtained a doctorate from Vienna University in 1858. Moving to Iași, he first worked for the city, then at its hospitals. In 1864, he was named administrator and professor at the Gregorian Institute, where for thirteen years he headed the midwives’ school. In 1872, recognizing his merits, the Romanian Parliament approved an endowment for his salary and for the school. In 1877, as the result of an intrigue, he was dismissed, and the government’s intercession on his behalf proved futile. He later published a series of medical works, including the 1888-1891 textbook Arta obstetricală.

His son was the stage actor Édouard de Max.
