= Mansur Ali Khan (disambiguation) =

Mansur Ali Khan (1830–1884) was Nawab of Bengal.

Mansur or Mansoor Ali Khan may also refer to:

== People ==
- Mansoor Ali Khan (actor), South Indian actor
- Mansoor Ali Khan Pataudi (1941–2011), Indian cricketer; he was also 9th and last Nawab of Pataudi
- Mansoor Ali Khan (Uttar Pradesh politician) (born 1941)
- Mansoor Ali Khan (Karnataka politician)
- Mansoor Ali Khan (journalist) (born 1976), Pakistani journalist and television anchor
- Mansur Ali Khan (Karnataka cricketer) (born 1972), Indian cricketer who has played for and coached Karnataka

== Other ==
- Mansur Ali Khan Pataudi Memorial Lecture, a lecture instituted by BCCI to honour the cricketer

== See also ==
- Mansur Khan (disambiguation)
- Mansoor Khan (fl. 1988–2008), Indian film director and producer
- Manzoor Ali Khan (1922–1980), Sindhi classical singer
