= Mac =

Mac or MAC may refer to:

== Common meanings ==
- Mac (computer), a line of personal computers made by Apple Inc.
- Mackintosh (raincoat), a raincoat made of rubberized cloth
- Mac, a prefix to surnames derived from Gaelic languages
- McIntosh (apple), a Canadian apple cultivar
- McDonalds, a fast food giant

== Arts and entertainment ==
=== Fictional entities ===
- Mac (Green Wing), a television character
- Mac (It's Always Sunny in Philadelphia), a television character
- Mac Gargan, an enemy of Spider-Man
- Mac, a character on Foster's Home for Imaginary Friends
- Angus "Mac" MacGyver, from the television series MacGyver
- Cindy "Mac" Mackenzie, from the TV series Veronica Mars
- Lt. Col. Sarah MacKenzie, from the TV series JAG
- Dr. Terrence McAfferty, from Robert Muchamore's CHERUB and Henderson's Boys novel series
- Randle McMurphy, in the movie One Flew Over the Cuckoo's Nest
- Mac Taylor, from the TV series CSI: NY
- Mac, a canine character in the television series Clifford the Big Red Dog
- Monster Attack Crew, a fictional pilot squadron in the television series Ultraman Leo
- MAC (Mysterious Alien Creature), the titular character in the 1988 film Mac and Me
- Mac (Makrand Deendayal Chatpatiya), portrayed by Akshay Kumar in the 2005 Indian comedy film Garam Masala

=== Other uses in arts and entertainment ===
- Mac (film), 1992, directed by and starring John Turturro
- Mac (novel), by John MacLean
- Mac the Moose, a public statue in Moose Jaw, Saskatchewan, Canada
- Mac, a Sports Beanie Baby cardinal produced by Ty, Inc. in 1999
- MAC Awards, for achievements in cabaret, comedy, and jazz, administered by the Manhattan Association of Cabarets & Clubs

== Business and economics ==
- Marginal abatement cost, in environmental economics
- Material adverse change, a provision in mergers and acquisitions contracts and venture financing agreements
- Money Access Card or Money Access Center, a former US ATM network
- Municipal Assistance Corporation, created by the State of New York in 1975 to deal with New York City's fiscal crisis
- Convention on Mutual Administrative Assistance in Tax Matters, developed jointly between the OECD and Council of Europe
- Myanmar Accountancy Council

== Education ==
=== Schools ===
- Macalester College, in Saint Paul, Minnesota, US
- Macdonald Campus, of McGill University, Canada
- McMaster University, in Canada
- Michigan Agricultural College, former name of Michigan State University, US

=== Museums and arts centers ===
- Costa Rican Museum of Art (Spanish: Museo de Arte Costarricense), Costa Rica
- mac, Birmingham (formerly Midlands Arts Centre), England
- Metropolitan Arts Centre, Belfast, UK
- Archaeology Museum of Catalonia (Spanish: Museu d'Arqueologia de Catalunya), Spain
- Niterói Contemporary Art Museum (Portuguese: Museu de Arte Contemporânea de Niterói), Brazil
- Museum of Contemporary Art of Lima (Spanish: Museo de Arte Contemporáneo), Peru

=== Other uses in education ===
- Murphree Area Council

== Military ==
- Manufacture d'armes de Châtellerault, a French state arms manufacturer
- Military Affairs Commission in China; see Central Military Commission (China)
- Military Airlift Command, the predecessor of the Air Mobility Command of the US Air Force
- Military Armament Corporation, former American small arms manufacturer
- Mission Assurance Category, a US Department of Defense engineering designation
- Mixed Armistice Commissions, a United Nations organization for monitoring Middle East ceasefires
- Modern Army Combatives, a hand-to-hand combat training regimen

== Organizations ==
The following organizations do not fit into any of those categories:

- Government:
  - Mainland Affairs Council, an agency under the Executive Yuan of the Republic of China
  - Municipal Assistance Corporation, created by the State of New York in 1975 to deal with New York City's fiscal crisis
  - Convention on Mutual Administrative Assistance in Tax Matters, developed jointly between the OECD and Council of Europe
- Non-profit:
  - Malaysian AIDS Council
  - Marine Aquarium Council
  - Myanmar Accountancy Council
- Politics:
  - Mouvement d'Action Civique, a defunct Belgian far right group
  - Mudiad Amddiffyn Cymru, a Welsh organization responsible for several bombing incidents
  - Muslims Against Crusades, a banned radical Islamist group in the UK
- Businesses:
  - MAC Cosmetics, a cosmetics brand, stylized as M•A•C
  - Macerich (NYSE stock symbol MAC), an American real estate investment trust
  - Medicare Administrative Contractor, a private company contracted to administer Medicare benefits in the US
  - Morgan Advanced Ceramics, a ceramics manufacturing company
  - Money Access Card or Money Access Center, a former US ATM network

== People ==
=== Names ===
- Mac (nickname)
- Mạc, a Vietnamese surname
- Mạc dynasty, 16th-century rulers in Vietnam

=== Individuals ===
- Mac (rapper) (born 1977), American rapper, stage name of McKinley Phipps Jr.
- MC Mac, member and musician of So Solid Crew
- John McCarthy (conductor) (1916–2009), British conductor known as "John Mac" or just "Mac"
- Derek McCulloch (1897–1967), British radio broadcaster known as "Uncle Mac"
- Ian McCulloch (singer) (born 1959), referred to as "Mac the Mouth" or just "Mac"
- Stanley McMurtry (born 1936), British cartoonist with the pen name "Mac"

== Places ==
- Macau (ISO 3166 code: MAC), an administrative region of China
- Macaulay railway station, Melbourne, Australia
- UCLA Marina Aquatic Center, a recreational facility in Marina del Rey, California
- Macomb station (Amtrac station code: MAC), Illinois, US
- Mid-America Center, an arena and convention center in Council Bluffs, Iowa

== Science and technology ==
=== Biology and medicine ===
- MAC (chemotherapy), a chemotherapy regimen of Mitoxantrone and Ara-C
- Malaysian AIDS Council
- Maximum allowable concentration, a concept related to threshold limit value (TLV)
- Medicare Administrative Contractor, a private company contracted to administer Medicare benefits in the US
- Membrane attack complex, an immune system function using complement
- Microbiota-accessible carbohydrates, a category of carbohydrates consumed by gut microbes
- Minimum alveolar concentration, a measure used to compare the strengths of anesthetic vapors
- Mitochondrial apoptosis-induced channel, the cytochrome c release pore of apoptotic mitochondria
- Monitored anesthesia care, a form of anesthesia with partial awareness
- Mycobacterium avium complex, a group of environmental pathogens

=== Computing and telecommunication ===
- Mac (computer), a brand of computers and computer operating systems made by Apple Inc.
  - macOS, formerly Mac OS X and OS X, Apple's current operating system for Mac computers
  - Classic Mac OS, the original operating system for Apple's Macintosh
  - .Mac, now iCloud, a subscription service by Apple
- MAC times, metadata containing event times associated with a computer file
- Mandatory access control, a type of access control in computer security
- Maximum activate count, a parameter associated with the LPDDR4 memory's TRR feature
- Medium access control or media access control, a sublayer of the Data Link layer
  - MAC address, a unique identifier assigned to a network interface controller
- Message authentication code, used to authenticate a message in cryptography
- Migration Authorisation Code, used when switching Internet service providers in the UK
- Multiplexed Analogue Components, a proposed satellite television transmission standard
- Multiply–accumulate operation (MAC), or multiplier–accumulator, in digital signal processing
- .mac, a file extension for macros in Agilent ChemStation software

=== Other science and technology ===
- Mean aerodynamic chord, a measure of the geometry of an airfoil

== Sports ==
=== Clubs and teams ===
- Maranhão Atlético Clube, a Brazilian association football club
- Marília Atlético Clube, a Brazilian association football club
- Missouri Athletic Club, a traditional gentlemen's and athletic club in downtown St. Louis, Missouri
- Multnomah Athletic Club, a private athletic club in Oregon

=== Conferences ===
==== College ====
- Mid-American Conference, an NCAA Division I (Football Bowl Subdivision) sports conference
- Mid-Atlantic Rifle Conference, an NCAA rifle-only conference
- Middle Atlantic Conferences, an umbrella organization for three NCAA Division III sports conferences
  - Middle Atlantic Conference, one of these three

==== High school ====
- Macomb Area Conference, a Michigan high school football conference
- Mayflower Athletic Conference, in the Massachusetts Interscholastic Athletic Association
- Mid-Atlantic Athletic Conference, a Washington, D.C., area high school athletic league
- Midwest Athletic Conference, an Ohio high school athletic conference in west-central Ohio
- Mississippi Athletic Conference, an Iowa high school sports conference
- Mountain Athletic Conference (PIAA), a Pennsylvania high school athletic conference

=== Other uses in sports ===
- MAC Award, in American college soccer, now merged into the Hermann Trophy
- UCLA Marina Aquatic Center, a recreational facility in Marina del Rey, California
- Mid-America Center, an arena and convention center in Council Bluffs, Iowa

== Transportation ==
- Macaulay railway station, Melbourne, Australia
- Macomb station (Amtrac station code: MAC), Illinois, US
- Mac Para Technology, a Czech aircraft manufacturer
- Malaysia Air Charter, an defunct airline
- Malta Air Charter, ICAO code, an defunct airline
- Martin's Air Charter, now Martinair, an airline
- Merchant aircraft carrier, used during World War II by Britain and the Netherlands
- Metropolitan Airports Commission, the operator of airports in the Minneapolis-St. Paul area
- Military Airlift Command, the predecessor of the Air Mobility Command of the US Air Force

== Other uses ==
- List of storms named Mac
- Macedonian language (ISO 639-2 code: mac)
- Material adequacy condition, in the philosophies of logic and language

== See also ==
- Big Mac (disambiguation)
- Fort McMurray, Alberta, Canada, nicknamed "Fort Mac"
- Little Mac (disambiguation)
- Macaroni and cheese, a dish often shortened to "mac and cheese"
- Mach (disambiguation)
- Mack (disambiguation)
- Mak (disambiguation)
