= UCLA Marina Aquatic Center =

Coordinates: 33.9679°N 118.4464°W

The UCLA Marina Aquatic Center (or MAC) is a waterfront recreation facility located in Marina del Rey, California at the northeastern end of the Entrance Channel, which is owned and operated by the University of California, Los Angeles.

The MAC, which is operated by UCLA Recreation, was opened in 1965 to house the Collegiate Rowing and Sailing programs. Since that time the MAC has expanded to offer recreational classes in small boat sailing, surfing, rowing, kayaking, windsurfing and stand-up paddle boarding to UCLA students.

Construction on the facility began in 1965. A cinder block boathouse was built to replace a wooden boathouse structure on Ballona Creek. In 1967 a dock was added to the entrance channel. In 1984 the installation of new trailers (which were previously used for the Los Angeles Olympics) was added to the facility.

== Sailing ==
The UCLA MAC currently provides classes in small boat sailing (under 16 feet in length). At one time there was an active keelboat program but it is no longer present at the facility. Beginning classes are taught in RS Quests and intermediate classes are taught in Lasers or RS Visions.

The UCLA Learn to Sail Manual is available free to the general public.

The MAC is also home to the UCLA Sailing Team, a recognized Collegiate Club Sport which competes within the Pacific Coast Collegiate Sailing Conference and the Intercollegiate Sailing Association.

== Kayaking ==
Recreational kayaking is taught at the UCLA MAC. "Sit-On-Top" kayaks as well as sea kayaks are used. The MAC is also home to the UCLA Kayak Polo team.

== Rowing ==
UCLA Women's Rowing is an NCAA varsity sport. UCLA Men's Rowing is a club sport. Both are housed at the UCLA MAC.

== Surfing ==
Recreational surfing classes are conducted at the MAC. The UCLA surf club is not connected to the MAC.

== Windsurfing ==
Windsurfing is a seasonal program that operates during the summer.

== Stand-Up Paddle Boarding ==
Stand-up paddleboard rentals and instruction are offered year round.
