= Mack Group =

- Company type: Private
- Industry: Contract manufacturing Plastics products
- Founded: 1920
- Headquarters: Arlington, Vermont; United States
- Key people: Will Kendall; President/CEO
- Products: Plastics products
- Revenue: US$ 650.0 Million
- Number of employees: 3,000 (2023)
- Divisions: Synectic Product Development; Mack Molding; Mack Prototype; Mack Technologies
- Website: www.mack.com

Mack Group is a privately held corporation providing contract manufacturing with specialties in plastics design, prototyping, molding, sheet metal fabrication and full product assembly.

Mack was founded in 1920 in Little Falls, N.J. Today, it is headquartered in Arlington, Vermont, and operates 11 locations throughout Vermont, Massachusetts, Connecticut, North Carolina, South Carolina, Florida, and Mexico, totaling 1,500,000 square feet (140,000 m^{2}) of manufacturing space. Mack Group employs over 3,000 and has revenues exceeding $650 million per year.

== Divisions of Mack Group ==
The divisions within Mack Group include:

=== Mack Molding ===
Supplies molded plastic parts, fabricated metal parts and high-level assemblies to the medical, commercial, computer & business equipment and transportation markets. Specialties include design, prototyping, custom injection molding, sheet metal fabrication and full product assembly, test and distribution. Six locations: Arlington, Vermont (2); Cavendish, Vermont; Pownal, Vermont; Inman, South Carolina; Statesville, North Carolina.

=== Mack Prototype ===
Plastics prototyping with specialties in rapid prototyping, rapid tooling and low volume plastics molding. Located in Gardner, Massachusetts.

=== Mack Technologies ===
Provides system assembly services for high-end electronic products. Specialties include design support, materials management, printed circuit board and final system assembly, product test and order fulfillment. Three locations: Westford, Massachusetts; Melbourne, Florida; Juarez, Mexico.

=== Synectic Product Development ===
Synectic product development is a full-service product development company focused on product design, prototyping, and manufacturing. Located in Woodbridge, Connecticut.
