= Metropolitan Area Commuter System =

Fairbanks, North Star Borough

Coordinates: 64°50′29″N 147°43′11″W

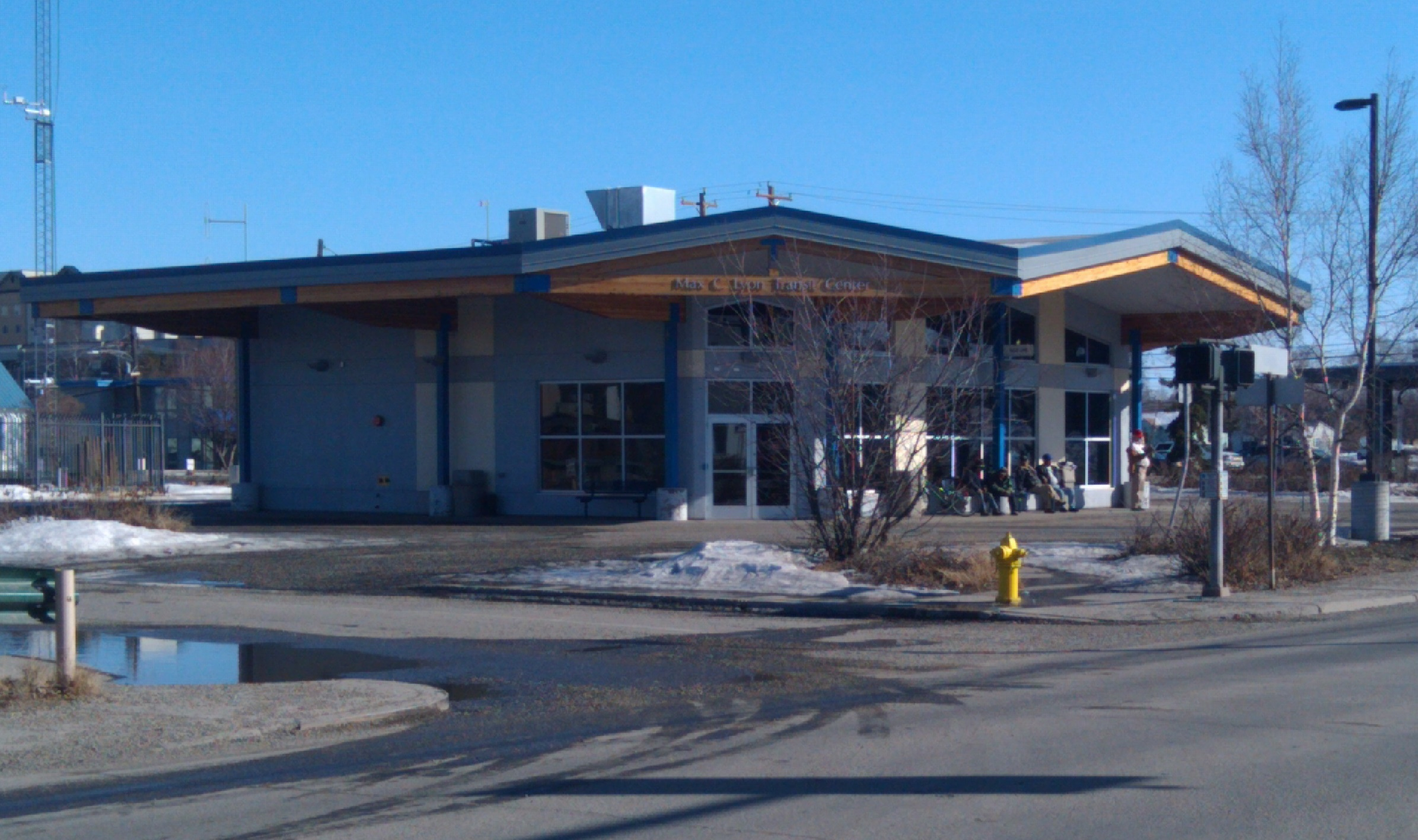
- Max C. Lyon Transit Center
- Parent: Fairbanks North Star Borough
- Founded: 1977
- Headquarters: 3175 Peger Road, Fairbanks AK 99709 (administration, operations); 501 Cushman Street, Fairbanks, AK 99701 (customer service, dispatch)
- Locale: Fairbanks, Alaska
- Service area: Fairbanks North Star Borough, Alaska
- Service type: bus service paratransit
- Routes: 8
- Stations: Max C. Lyon Jr. Transit Center
- Fleet: 18
- Daily ridership: 202,075 (annual)
- Fuel type: Diesel, Concentrated Natural Gas
- Website: fnsb.gov/349/Metropolitan-Area-Commuter-System-MACS

Metropolitan Area Commuter System (MACS) is a public transport agency in Fairbanks North Star Borough, Alaska. The agency provides bus service for much of the urbanized Fairbanks Metropolitan Statistical Area. MACS is part of the borough's transportation department and is the northernmost local bus network in the United States and continental North America.

== History ==
Prior to the formation of MACS, the public transit needs of Fairbanks were served, if at all, mostly by private operators. The longest-lasting of these was University Bus Lines, operated by Paul Greimann, Sr. University Bus Lines primarily provided service to and from Fairbanks, the University of Alaska campus, and Ladd Air Force Base, now Fort Wainwright.

The Fairbanks North Star Borough began exploring the possibilities of offering public transit during the 1970s, when the population and economy of Fairbanks began exploding in conjunction with the construction of the Trans-Alaska Pipeline System. Voters in the City of Fairbanks voted in 1976 to allow operation of transit buses by the FNSB over the streets of Fairbanks. The system began operating in 1977 with two routes serving the Fairbanks urban area.

A 1978 study recommended offering service to the outlying areas of the borough, including Ester, Chena Ridge Road, Farmers Loop Road and Goldstream Road. The system expanded to serve North Pole, Salcha and Farmers Loop, Fort Wainwright and other areas of the Fairbanks area. The system now operates 8 routes, and travels over 723,228 miles every year.

== Routes ==
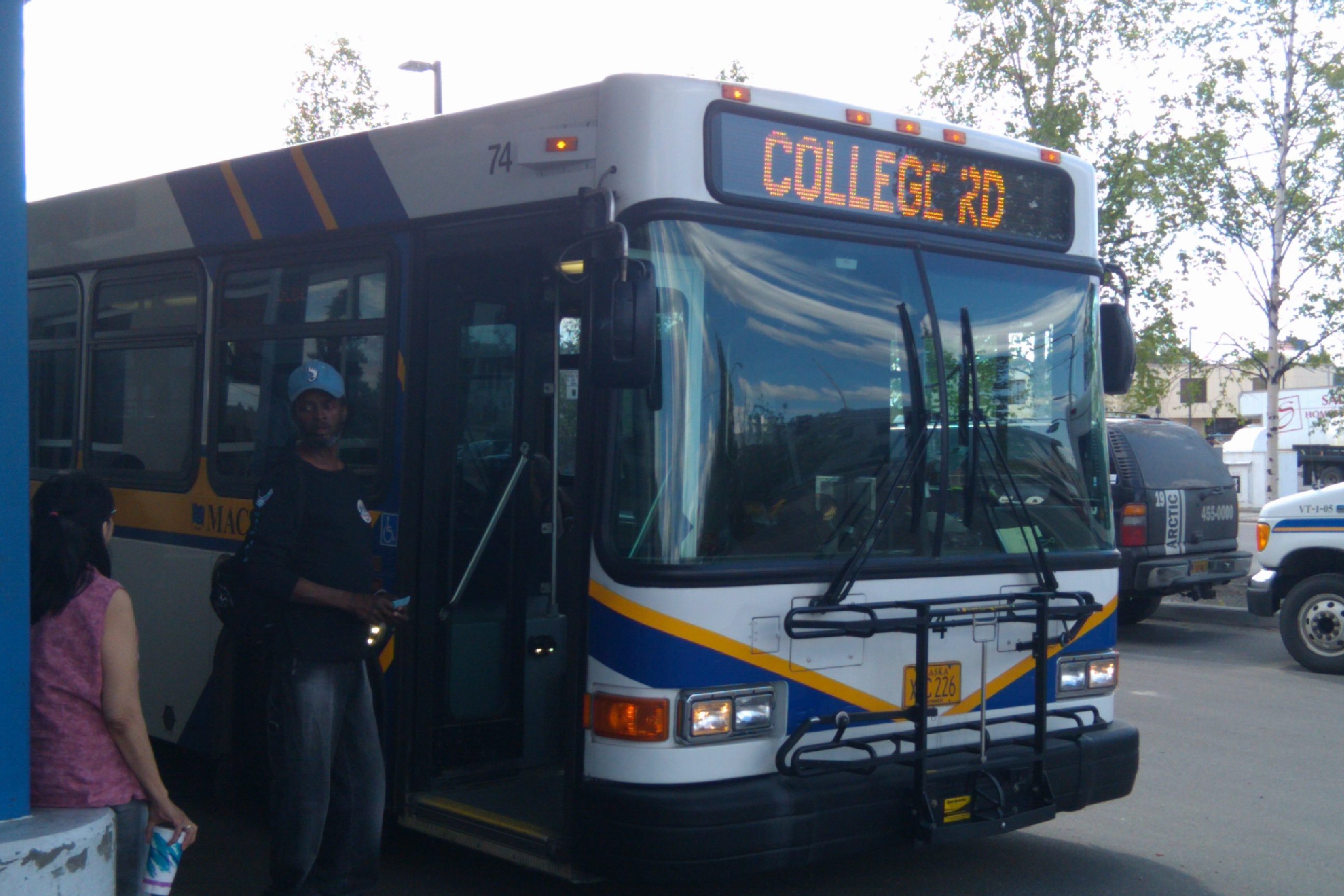
Blue Line bus laying over at the Transit Center.

MACS has eight fixed routes identified by color. The Red and Blue Lines provide loop service around urban Fairbanks in opposing directions, while the other routes connect to more outlying destinations. Only the Grey Line does not connect to the Transit Center or overlap with other routes, requiring a transfer from either University of Alaska Fairbanks (UAF) or Fred Meyer East to connect to other routes.

No service is provided on Sundays and holidays. Some routes also lack service on Saturdays.

| Route | Major Destinations | Schedule |
|---|---|---|
| Blue Line | Walmart, College Road/Diane, Aurora/Tamarack, UAF Wood Center, UAF Museum, Fred Meyer West, Pioneer Park, Carlson Center, Shoppers Forum | |
| Red Line | Shoppers Forum, Fred Meyer West, University/Sandvik, UAF Wood Center, Aurora/Tamarack, Helmricks Street/Mt McKinley Bank | |
| Brown Line | C Street & Eureka, Bentley Mall, Fred Meyer East | |
| Green Line | Old Richardson/South Cushman, McPeak's, Badger/Nordale, North Pole Mall, North Pole High School, North Pole Middle School/Wescott Pool, Santa Claus House, Beaverbrook Mall, Badger/Nordale, McPeak's | |
| Grey Line | Fred Meyer East, McGrath Road to Town and Country Mobile Home Park, Summit Drive, Grenac Road, Scenic Loop, Ballaine Road, UAF Wood Center | |
| Orange Line | Big Dipper Ice Arena, FNA Head Start, Van Horn & Lathrop, Transit Admin. Offices, Jillian Square, Fred Meyer West | |
| Purple Line | Easy Street, 23rd & Lathrop, Chief Andrew Isaac Health Center, Fairbanks Memorial Hospital | |
| Yellow Line | Fred Meyer West, Fairbanks International Airport, UAF Wood Center, University West | |

== Fares ==
| Fare category | Single Ride | Day Pass | Monthly Pass | Half-month Pass |
|---|---|---|---|---|
| Adult | US $1.50 | US $3 | US $40 | US $20 |
| Reduced fare | US $0.75 | US $2 | US $20 | |

Reduced fare rides are offered to youth (ages 6 to 18), individuals with Medicare or Medicaid cards, active duty military servicemembers and their dependents, and those with qualifying disabilities.

Free fare rides are offered to seniors (ages 60+) and children (ages 0-5). Seniors must show government issued photo identification to the driver to ride for free.

== Fleet ==
The fleet consists of twelve Gillig Low Floor buses and six demand response vehicles used by the Van Tran service.

== Van Tran ==
While all MACS vehicles are wheelchair accessible, the transit system also operates van service for patrons unable to use the standard bus services. Vans provide door to door service. In accordance with the Americans with Disabilities Act of 1990, service is prioritized by one's ADA status, not necessarily by need.

In 2011, an effort was initiated to privatize Van Tran. Spearheaded by conservative Fairbanks North Star Borough Assembly members Diane Hutchinson and Michael Dukes, the system's cost, estimated at between US $61.71 and $76 per ride, was cited as justification. However, a study commissioned by the Borough Assembly found that privatization would only result in minor cost savings, and no action towards privatization was taken.
