= Mad Max (disambiguation) =

Mad Max is an Australian media franchise.

Mad Max may also refer to:

== Films ==
- Mad Max (film), released in 1979
- Mad Max 2, released in 1981
- Mad Max Beyond Thunderdome, released in 1985
- Mad Max: Fury Road, released in 2015
- Furiosa: A Mad Max Saga, released in 2024

== Related topics ==
- Mad Max (soundtrack), the soundtrack for the first film
- Mad Max (1990 video game), NES game based on Mad Max 2
- Mad Max (2015 video game), based on the franchise
- Mad Max series legacy and influence in popular culture
- Max Rockatansky, the main protagonist of the film series

== People ==
- Jochen Hippel (born 1971), German musician
- Vernon Maxwell (born 1965), American basketball player
- Max Papis (born 1969), Italian race car driver
- Max Biaggi (born 1971), Italian motorcycle racer
- Aravinda de Silva (born 1965), Sri Lankan former cricketer
- Max Scherzer, American baseball pitcher
- Maxwell R. Thurman (1931–1995), American general
- Maxime Bernier, nicknamed Mad Max, a Canadian politician
- Max Tegmark, nicknamed Mad Max, a physicist
- Max Verstappen (born 1997), Dutch race car driver
- Maksim Gelman (born 1987), Spree killer

== Other uses ==
- Mad Max (band), a German hard rock band

== See also ==
- Mad Maxine, a journalist and former professional wrestler
- MAD (disambiguation)
- Max (disambiguation)
