= Édouard de Max =

Romanian actor

De Max in Le Roi de Rome, 1897

Édouard Alexandre de Max (born Eduard-Alexandru Max Romalo; 14 February 1869 – 28 October 1924) was a Romanian actor who became a star in Parisian theatre. As a student at the Paris Conservatoire he won prizes for tragedy and comedy, but it was as a tragedian that he became celebrated, appearing in classic works by Shakespeare, Racine, Schiller, Victor Hugo and others, as well as new works by writers including Oscar Wilde, Victorien Sardou and Henri Bernstein. He appeared with many leading performers, including Gabrielle Réjane, but his best known and most frequent partnership was with Sarah Bernhardt.

De Max's career was curtailed by ill health, and within two months of his final performance, at the Comédie-Française, he died at his Paris home at the age of 55.

== Life and career ==
=== 19th century ===
De Max was born in Iași, Romania, on 14 February 1869. His father was the physician Emil Max, whose home regularly hosted actors, cultural figures and writers. Emil was Jewish, while his wife Pulheria descended from two Phanariote (Greco-Romanian) families, the Romalos and Rosettis (or Rusets). (Note: De Max's maternal grandfather, Iordache Grigoriadi Romalo, had served the court of Moldavia as a secretary; his great-grandfather was Spatharios Iordache Ruset-Roznovanu. This made him a direct descendant of the 17th-century Paharnic Lascaris Rosetto, who had established the Rosetti branch in Moldavia.) Not a very diligent student, according to the memoirist Rudolf Suțu, Eduard attended the first two grades at the National College, following which he was sent to study at Lausanne. Returning to Romania in 1884, he briefly studied at Mihai Viteazul High School in Bucharest. He then moved to Paris and entered the Lycée Louis-le-Grand, going on to the Paris Conservatoire in 1888.

At the conservatoire de Max studied under Gustave Worms, and in 1891 he won the conservatoire's first prize for comedy with Gringoire and for tragedy with Hamlet, the first time the same student won both. Despite the prize for comedy, it was in tragedy that he became known, and in which he most often appeared. He made his first professional appearance on the stage at the Odéon Theatre, Paris as Neron in Britannicus in 1891. Earlier, in Sinaia, he had appeared on an improvised set beside Elena Văcărescu in an André Theuriet play; despite public enthusiasm, no Bucharest theatre hired him.

At the Théâtre de la Renaissance in 1893 de Max appeared in Izeyl, Gismonda and La Princesse Lointaine, after which he returned to the Odéon in Don Carlos and Don Juan en Flandre. At the Théâtre Antoine in 1897 he appeared in Le Repas du Lion, Joseph d'Arimathie, La Gitane and other plays, and at the Nouveau-Théâtre he appeared in leading parts in Le Roi de Rome and Salome.

With Sarah Bernhardt in Sardou's Gismonda, 1896

De Max became a conspicuous figure in the Paris of the fin de siècle and early 20th-century. He was a flamboyant personality, "flirtatious, outrageously camp", according to a biographer, and had a reputation as a gay seducer, although one of his protégés, Jean Cocteau, wrote that this was something of a myth. His acting style was similarly flamboyant, and was disliked by those who preferred subtlety: he was widely regarded as well suited to act with his frequent stage partner, Sarah Bernhardt, who also favoured big, broad dramatic effect. Cocteau wrote that like Bernhardt "he was ignorant of codes or formulas. He searched and invented." Offstage he was known for his generosity to struggling young artists and to the poor in general.

=== 20th century ===
In the first two decades of the 20th century, de Max continued to appear mostly in serious, often tragic plays, but he made a single diversion into opera in 1900, playing the spoken title role in Fauré's Prométhée. His roles included Peter in Quo Vadis?, Claude Frollo in Notre Dame de Paris, Le Roi Christian in Le Manteau du Roi, and De Pantoya in Electra at the Théâtre de la Porte Saint-Martin between 1901 and 1906. At the Odéon in 1906 he played King Lear, and Marc Antony in Julius Caesar. At the Théâtre Sarah Bernhardt he played in Francesca da Rimini, Théroigne de Méricourt, Werther, Polyeucte and La Sorciere. In 1908 he acted with Gabrielle Réjane at the Théâtre Réjane in Henri Bernstein's Israël; the play was controversial but the performances of both stars were warmly praised.

De Max played the title role in Timon of Athens at the Théâtre Antoine (1907). In 1911–12 he played a season at the Théâtre Sarah Bernhardt in plays including La Conquete d'Athenes, Le Proces de Jeanne d'Arc and Le Typhon. He added Shylock to his repertoire in 1916. In 1917 he was engaged by the Comédie-Française and was elected a sociétaire in the same year. His roles there included Neron in Britannicus, Esope, the monk in La Cloître, Baron de Horn in Le Prince d'Aurec, Jules de Miremmont in Le Repas du Lion, Basile in Le Barbier de Seville, Oreste in Andromaque, Sisyphe in La Morte enchainée and Xerxes in Les Perses. In 1920 he appeared at the Opéra as Antony in Antony and Cleopatra. He played in a number of silent films; co-stars included Bernhardt and Maurice Chevalier.

In 1904 and 1915 de Max returned on tour to his native country, playing in Bucharest, Iași, Constanța, Craiova and Galați in his favourite plays alongside a fellow emigrant, Maria Ventura. He also acted in works by domestic writers, such as Octavian Goga and Alexandru Davila. Before Romania's 1916 entry into the First World War he wrote in favour of its joining the Allies. During the war he took part in dramatic festivals organised by Romanian students at the University of Paris. He never renounced his Romanian citizenship.

De Max struggled with illness in his later years, and made several stays in Tunisia for the good of his health. His last appearance was at the Comédie-Française in September 1924, appearing against medical advice in Erckmann-Chatrian's L'Ami Fritz. He died at his flat in the Rue de Caumartin on 28 October 1924, aged 55. In an obituary tribute Le Figaro said:

He had an incomparable speaking voice. His deep knowledge of Greek and Latin literature, and of French literature, his understanding, the admirable diversity of his acting, and his dramatic power ranked him among the foremost artists of his generation. … We are indebted to M. de Max for unforgettable memories. As an artist, he was distinguished by his wonderful gifts, his culture, his sensitivity. His place remains vacant. We will not console ourselves that it will be filled.

== Notes, references and sources ==
=== Sources ===
==== Books ====
- Bentley, Eric (1956). From the Modern Repertoire: Series Three. Bloomington: Indiana University Press. OCLC 637185743.
- Cajal, Nicolae; Kuller, Hary (2004). Contribuția evreilor din România la cultură și civilizație. Bucharest: Editura Hasefer. ISBN 978-973-630-067-7.
- Cocteau, Jean (1967). My Contemporaries. London: Peter Owen. OCLC 223395925.
- Core, Philip (1984). Camp: The Lie that Tells the Truth. London: Plexus. ISBN 978-0-85-965045-8.
- Izzard, Forrest (1915). Heroines of the Modern Stage. New York: Sturgis and Walton. OCLC 1046041361.
- Maftei, Ionel (1972). Personalități ieșene: Omagiu. Vol. I. Iași: Comitetul de cultură și educație socialistă al județului Iași. OCLC 490701041.
- Mitican, Ion (2005). Evreii din Tîrgu Cucului ... de altădată: cîteva aduceri aminte. Iași: Editura Tehnopress. ISBN 978-9-73-702247-9.
- Nectoux, Jean-Michel (1991). Gabriel Fauré: A Musical Life. Cambridge: Cambridge University Press. ISBN 978-0-52-123524-2.
- Parker, John, ed. (1922). Who's Who in the Theatre (fourth ed.). London: Sir Isaac Pitman and Sons. OCLC 473894893.
- Rînziș, Filofteia (2001). Arhive personale şi familiale (PDF). Vol. I. Bucharest: Ministry of Culture and Religious Affairs. ISBN 973-8308-04-6.
- Steegmuller, Francis (1970). Cocteau: A Biography. London: Macmillan. ISBN 978-0-33-301249-9.
- Stoullig, Edmond (1909). Les annales du théatre et de la musique: trente-quatrième année, 1908. Paris: Librairie Paul Ollendorff. OCLC 1123752326.
- Williams, James S. (2008). Jean Cocteau. London: Reaktion Books. ISBN 978-1-86-189354-3.

==== Journals ====
- Matache, Florentina (2016). "Conacul Rosetti-Balș din Pribești, județul Vaslui". Revista Monumentelor Istorice. LXXXI (1): 59–77.
