= Max Township, Itasca County, Minnesota =

Max Township, Minnesota
- Township
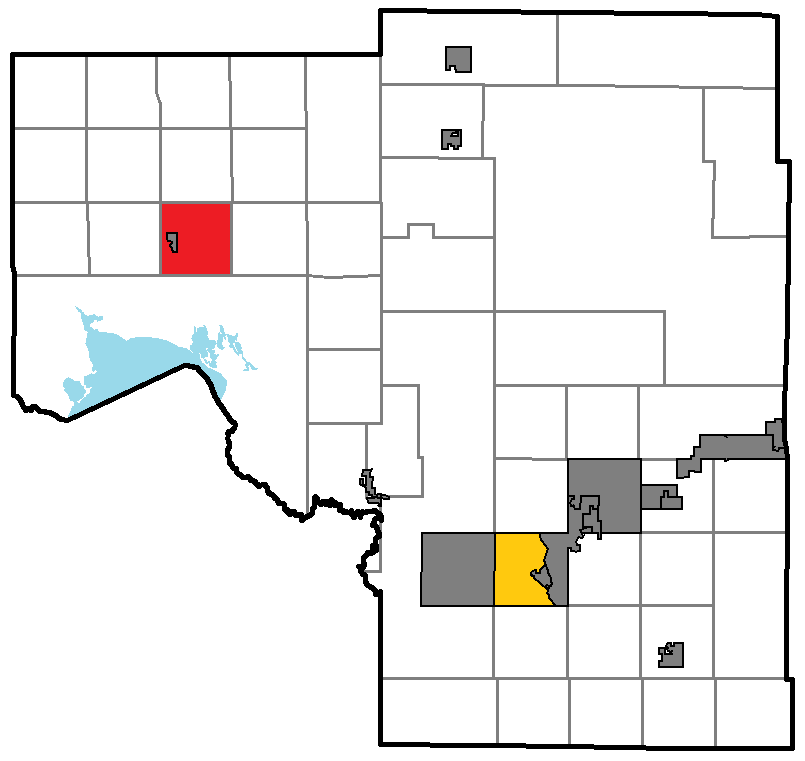
- Location of Max Township, within Itasca County, Minnesota
- Coordinates: 47°37′17″N 94°5′35″W
- Country: United States
- State: Minnesota
- County: Itasca

Area
  - Total: 34.2 sq mi (88.6 km^{2})
  - Land: 28.7 sq mi (74.4 km^{2})
  - Water: 5.5 sq mi (14.3 km^{2})
- Elevation: 1,352 ft (412 m)

Population (2020)
  - Total: 127
  - Density: 4.42/sq mi (1.71/km^{2})
- Time zone: UTC-6 (Central (CST))
  - Summer (DST): UTC-5 (CDT)
- ZIP code: 56659
- Area code: 218
- FIPS code: 27-41066
- GNIS feature ID: 0664929

Max Township is a township in Itasca County, Minnesota, United States. The population was 127 at the 2020 census.

== Geography ==
According to the United States Census Bureau, the township has a total area of 34.2 square miles (88.6 km^{2}), of which 28.7 square miles (74.4 km^{2}) is land and 5.5 square miles (14.3 km^{2}), or 16.10%, is water.

== Demographics ==
As of the census of 2000, there were 156 people, 59 households, and 42 families living in the township. The population density was 5.4 inhabitants per square mile (2.1/km^{2}). There were 125 housing units at an average density of 4.4 per square mile (1.7/km^{2}). The racial makeup of the township was 64.74% White, 19.23% Native American, and 16.03% from two or more races. Hispanic or Latino of any race were 3.21% of the population.

There were 59 households, out of which 27.1% had children under the age of 18 living with them, 52.5% were married couples living together, 8.5% had a female householder with no husband present, and 28.8% were non-families. 22.0% of all households were made up of individuals, and 15.3% had someone living alone who was 65 years of age or older. The average household size was 2.64 and the average family size was 3.14.

In the township the population was spread out, with 29.5% under the age of 18, 6.4% from 18 to 24, 19.2% from 25 to 44, 26.3% from 45 to 64, and 18.6% who were 65 years of age or older. The median age was 43 years. For every 100 females, there were 108.0 males. For every 100 females age 18 and over, there were 107.5 males.

The median income for a household in the township was $21,500, and the median income for a family was $22,000. Males had a median income of $27,083 versus $10,833 for females. The per capita income for the township was $13,889. About 18.2% of families and 20.5% of the population were below the poverty line, including 13.2% of those under the age of eighteen and 33.3% of those 65 or over.
