= Big Mack =

Big Mack may refer to fictional characters:

- The Apple Dumpling Gang Rides Again § Cast
- Body Fever § Cast
