= Anti-Corruption Commission of Myanmar =

Government agency of Myanmar

Anti-Corruption Commission
- အဂတိလိုက်စားမှုတိုက်ဖျက်ရေးကော်မရှင်

Commission overview
- Formed: 25 February 2014; 12 years ago
- Preceding Commission: Anti-Bribery Commission
- Jurisdiction: Government of Myanmar
- Headquarters: Office No. 56, Nay Pyi Taw
- Motto: Remove Corruption, Promote Prosperity
- Commission executive: Sit Aye, Chairman
- Website: www.accm.gov.mm/acc/

The Anti-Corruption Commission of Myanmar (Burmese: အဂတိလိုက်စားမှု တိုက်ဖျက်ရေး ကော်မရှင်; abbreviated ACC) is a 15-member body responsible for investigating corruption allegations in Myanmar. It was formed under the 2013 Anti-Corruption Law, which was enacted in September 2013.

== History ==
The commission was formed on 25 February 2014. Initially, most of the appointed members were former high-ranking military personnel. On 23 November 2017, in accordance with Section 7 of the anti-corruption law, the commission was reformed with President Htin Kyaw naming 12 commission members.

== Chairs ==
Chairs of the Anti-Corruption Commission
No.	Name	Took office	Left office	Appointer	Ref
1	Mya Win	25 February 2014	22 November 2017	President Thein Sein	
2	Aung Kyi	23 November 2017	1 December 2020	President Htin Kyaw	
3	Tin Oo	20 February 2021	18 August 2022	State Administration Council	
4	Than Swe	19 August 2023	31 January 2023	State Administration Council	
5	Dr Htay Aung	1 February 2023	2 August 2023	State Administration Council	
6	Sit Aye	3 August 2023	Present	State Administration Council	

== Landmark cases ==
- The Commission filed anti-corruption cases against former Director General of Food and Drug Administration (FDA), Dr. Than Htut regarding corruption in construction projects under Ministry of Health and Sports with sub-standard building quality and abusing his power in the ownership of a house and plot of land valued at over 150 million kyats.
- The Commission filed anti-corruption cases against former Yangon Region advocate general Han Htoo and five other officials regarding receiving bribes to dismiss the charges and release three men suspected of killing comedian Aung Ye Htwe in 2018.
- The Commission filed anti-corruption cases against former Chief Minister of Tanintharyi Region Lei Lei Maw regarding violation of section 55 of the Anti-Corruption Law in March 2019.
