= MAX Index =

Domestic government bond market benchmarks in Hungary

The MAX Index family is a set of widely used domestic government bond market benchmarks in Hungary. The index family consists of the RMAX, MAX, MAX Composite and ZMAX indices. The indices calculated and published by the Hungarian Government Debt Management Agency Ltd. on a daily basis. The index calculation method follows the EFFAS Bond Commission's total return bond index recommendations.

== Index characteristics ==
The inception date is December 31, 1996 and each index consists of local currency-denominated fixed-rate government bonds and bills of the Hungarian Republic.

- RMAX Index consists of bills and bonds in maturity range of 91–365 days and rebalances every fortnight
- MAX Index consists of bonds in maturity range of over 365 days and rebalances monthly
- MAX Composite Index is the composite of the RMAX and MAX indices
- ZMAX Index consists of bills and bonds in maturity range of 14–182 days and rebalances weekly

== External sources ==
- Government Debt Management Agency Ltd.
- Detailed Index Descriptions
