= Mack (given name) =

Mack is a given name and nickname. Notable people with the name include:

== Given name ==
- Mack Beggs (born 1999), American high school wrestler
- Mack Brown (born 1951), head coach of the University of Texas at Austin Longhorn football team
- Mack Brown (running back) (born 1991), American football player
- Mack C. Chase (born 1931), American oil and natural gas tycoon
- Mack Calvin (born 1947), American former basketball player
- Mack Coleman (1952–1977), American basketball player
- Mack David (1912–1993), American lyricist and songwriter
- Mack Ray Edwards (1918–1971), American child sex abuser/serial killer; committed suicide by hanging in his prison cell.
- Mack Guest IV, American politician
- Mack Herron (1948–2015), American former football running back
- Mack Hollins (born 1993), American football player
- Mack Jones (1938–2004), American Major League Baseball player
- Mack Lee Hill (1940–1965), American college and professional football player
- Mack Mitchell (born 1952), American former football player
- Mack Charles Parker (1936–1959), African-American victim of lynching in the US
- Mack Wilson (born 1998), American football player

== Nickname ==
- Mack Flenniken, American football player, coach, and sports figure
- Mack McCarthy, former head college basketball coach for East Carolina University
- Mack Miller, American former cross-country skier and trainer Andrew Markley (1931–2020)

== Stage name ==
- Mack Gordon (1904–1959), American composer and lyricist of songs for stage and film, born Morris Gittler
- Mack Sennett (1880-1960), Canadian director and actor born Michael Sinnott
- Mack Swain (1876–1935), American actor and vaudevillian born Moroni Swain

== Fictional characters ==
- Mack Bolan, main character of The Executioner book series
- Mack Hartford, a red ranger character from the television series Power Rangers Operation Overdrive
- Mack (Cars), an anthropomorphic semi-trailer truck from the film Cars, based on a Mack truck
- Mack, the boss who held the first Star Piece in Super Mario RPG: Legend of the Seven Stars
- Mack the Knife, the eponymous serial killer in the song Mack the Knife

== See also ==
- Mac (nickname)
