= Mac (novel) =

1987 novel by John MacLean

Mac is a youth novel by John MacLean about a young teenage boy dealing with a sexual assault. Mac was published in 1987 by Houghton Mifflin.

Mac is a quiet 14-year-old schoolboy who is just discovering girls. A new girl, Jenny, joins his year group and all the 'state-of-the-art' kids boast how they are going to make her their girl. Mac is awkward and shy around her, but she makes the moves and picks him as he is different from all the other boys. But something happens to ruin their relationship.

Mac is sexually assaulted by the school doctor during a routine examination. As a consequence, Mac undergoes dramatic personality changes that leaves his friends and family baffled; he is hostile to all of their efforts to discover his problem.

A professional counselor at school finally earns his trust, and Mac reveals what happened during the physical examination.
