= MAK (gene) =

Protein-coding gene in the species Homo sapiens

Identifiers
- Aliases: MAK, RP62, dJ417M14.2, male germ cell associated kinase
- External IDs: OMIM: 154235; MGI: 96913; HomoloGene: 31344; GeneCards: MAK; OMA:MAK - orthologs

Gene location (Human)
Chr.	Chromosome 6 (human)
Band	6p24.2	Start	10,762,723 bp
Band	6p24.2	End	10,838,553 bp

Gene location (Mouse)
Chr.	Chromosome 13 (mouse)
Band	13 A3.3|13 20.25 cM	Start	41,178,484 bp
Band	13 A3.3|13 20.25 cM	End	41,233,182 bp
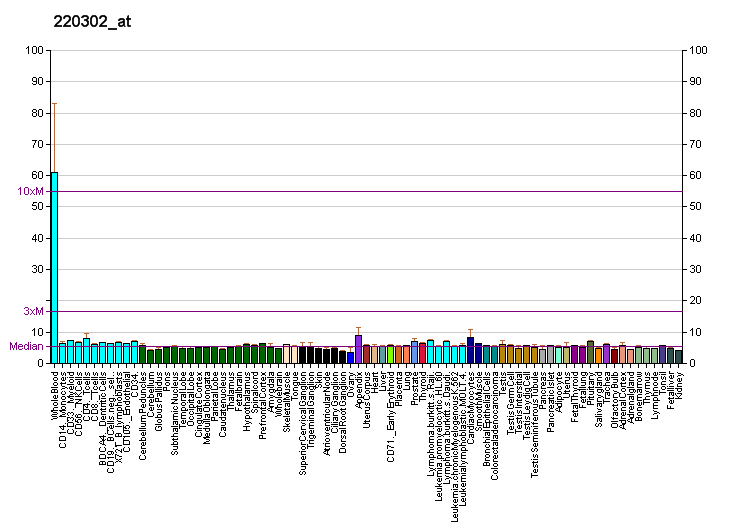
RNA expression pattern
Bgee	Human / Mouse (ortholog); Top expressed in: sperm; Epithelium of choroid plexus; bronchial epithelial cell; right uterine tube; testicle; epithelium of nasopharynx; blood; mucosa of paranasal sinus; left testis; right testis / Top expressed in: neural layer of retina; spermatid; seminiferous tubule; spermatocyte; epithelium of lens; retinal pigment epithelium; outer nuclear layer; Epithelium of choroid plexus; right lung lobe; respiratory epithelium; More reference expression data
BioGPS	More reference expression data
Gene ontology
Molecular function	transferase activity; protein kinase activity; nucleotide binding; transcription coactivator activity; kinase activity; protein binding; ATP binding; metal ion binding; protein serine/threonine kinase activity
Cellular component	centrosome; cell projection; photoreceptor inner segment; spindle; photoreceptor outer segment; microtubule organizing center; midbody; mitotic spindle; cytoskeleton; nucleus; cytoplasm; cilium; axoneme; motile cilium; photoreceptor connecting cilium; ciliary tip
Biological process	cell differentiation; regulation of transcription, DNA-templated; phosphorylation; transcription, DNA-templated; multicellular organism development; protein phosphorylation; spermatogenesis; protein autophosphorylation; regulation of gene expression; intracellular signal transduction; intraciliary transport; cilium assembly; photoreceptor cell maintenance; negative regulation of non-motile cilium assembly; positive regulation of nucleic acid-templated transcription
Sources:Amigo / QuickGO
Orthologs
Species	Human	Mouse
Entrez	4117	17152
Ensembl	ENSG00000111837	ENSMUSG00000021363
UniProt	P20794	Q04859
RefSeq (mRNA)	NM_001242385; NM_001242957; NM_005906; NM_001377262	NM_001145802; NM_001145803; NM_008547
RefSeq (protein)	NP_001229314; NP_001229886; NP_005897; NP_001364191	NP_001139274; NP_001139275; NP_032573
Location (UCSC)	Chr 6: 10.76 – 10.84 Mb	Chr 13: 41.18 – 41.23 Mb
PubMed search
- Wikidata
View/Edit Human	View/Edit Mouse

Serine/threonine-protein kinase MAK is an enzyme that in humans is encoded by the MAK gene.

The product of this gene is a serine/threonine protein kinase related to kinases involved in cell cycle regulation. It is expressed almost exclusively in the testis, primarily in germ cells. Studies of the mouse and rat homologs have localized the kinase to the chromosomes during meiosis in spermatogenesis, specifically to the synaptonemal complex that exists while homologous chromosomes are paired. There is, however, a study of the mouse homolog that has identified high levels of expression in developing sensory epithelia so its function may be more generalized.
