= Office of the Auditor General (Myanmar) =

- ပြည်ထောင်စုစာရင်းစစ်ချုပ်ရုံး
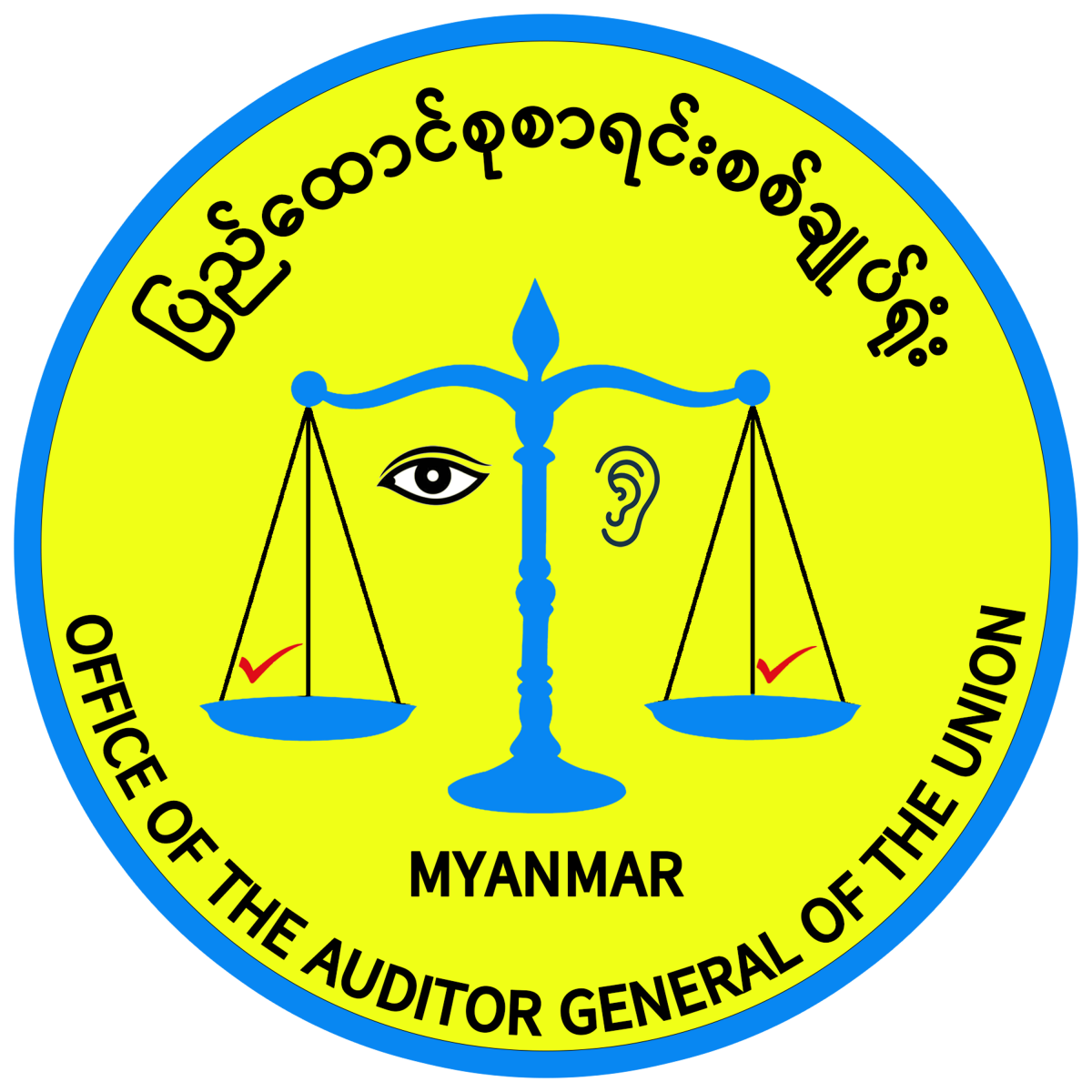

Agency overview
- Formed: 12 January 1972; 54 years ago
- Type: Agency
- Jurisdiction: Government of Burma
- Headquarters: Office No (12), Naypyidaw
- Agency executive: Tin Oo, Auditor General
- Website: www.oagmac.gov.mm

The Office of the Auditor General (Burmese: ပြည်ထောင်စုစာရင်းစစ်ချုပ်ရုံး; abbreviated OAG) is an independent government body that serves as the auditor of the Government of Myanmar (Burma). The Office of the Auditor General is currently held by Tin Oo.

== History ==
The Office of the Auditor General was first formally established during British rule, under the Burma Act of 1935. In post-colonial Burma, the Office of the Auditor General was initially established in 1948 under the Parliament's Auditor General Act of 1948, which provided for the appointment of the auditor general. In 1974, the Pyithu Hluttaw passed the Council of People’s Inspectors Law, which repealed the 1948 law and merged all auditing agencies, except the Controller of Military Accounts, into a centralised agency, the Central Accounts Office, in January 1974. Between 1974 and 1988, the office was called Chairman of The Council of People's Inspectors. On 27 September 1988, the State Law and Order Restoration Council (SLORC), which had recently seized power, appointed an Auditor General and Deputy Auditor General, under Order No. 7/88, and repealed the 1975 Law under Order No. 5/88 and the Auditor General Law of 1988. On 8 March 1994, the State Law and Order Restoration Council replaced the Accounting Law, which established an Office of the Auditor General of the Union (OAG) that acts as the Secretariat of the Myanmar Accountancy Council, the nation's professional accountancy body. OAG's functions are currently governed by the 2008 Constitution of Myanmar (Burma) and the Auditor General of the Union Law of 2010, which repealed the 1988 law. Thein Htaik died and a new auditor general, U Myo Myint, was appointed to the position in 2016.

== List of auditors-general ==
- San Lwin (1948–1968)
- San Maung (1968–1976)
- Ohn Tin (1986–1988)
- Khin Zaw (1988–1994)
- Aung Khin Tint (1994–1998)
- Tin Aye (1998–2003)
- Lun Maung (2003–2011)
- Thein Htaik (7 September 2012 – 3 May 2015)
- Myo Myint (13 January 2016 – 29 March 2016)
- Maw Than (6 April 2016 – 31 January 2021)
- Kan Zaw (2021–21 August 2022)
- Tin Oo (2022 to present)

== See also ==
- Cabinet of Myanmar (Burma)
- Myanmar Accountancy Council
