= Mighty Max =

Mighty Max may refer to:

- Mighty Max (toyline), a series of toys from Bluebird Toys
  - Mighty Max (TV series), a television series based on the toys
  - The Adventures of Mighty Max, a 1994 video game based on the television series
- Max Weinberg, an American drummer and television personality
- Mitsubishi Mighty Max, a pickup truck sold by Mitsubishi Motors
