= Little Mac (disambiguation) =

Little Mac is the main character from the Punch-Out!! video game series.

Little Mac may also refer to:

== People ==
- George B. McClellan (1826–1885), American Civil War general and politician
- Joe McEwing (born 1973), American former Major League Baseball player
- Little Mack Simmons (1933–2000), American blues harmonica player and singer

== Places ==
- Little Mac Ski Hill, a ski area in Mackenzie, British Columbia

== See also ==
- Big Mac (disambiguation)
- Mac (disambiguation)
