= Makk (disambiguation) =

Makk is a Sudanic title meaning "king".

Makk may also refer to:

== People ==
- Károly Makk (1925–2017), Hungarian film director
- Americo Makk (1927–2015), Hungarian-American painter

== Acronyms ==
- Museum für Angewandte Kunst (Cologne)
