= Luca Saba =

Italian radiologist and neuroradiologist

Luca Saba is an Italian radiologist and neuroradiologist. He has made contributions in the field of imaging for the detection and characterization of vulnerable plaque and the identification of the causes of stroke. He is also the author of both American. and European consensus documents on this matter.

Currently, Saba holds the position of Professor and Chair of Radiology at the University of Cagliari in Cagliari, Italy. He also serves as the Dean of the School of Medicine in the same university. In addition, Saba is the Editor-in-Chief of The Neuroradiology Journal and co-chair of the vascular section of the QIBA Quantitative Imaging Biomarker Alliance. He is on the editorial board of 10 journals and has authored over 650 papers in peer-reviewed journals, including notable journals like the New England Journal of Medicine, Lancet Neurology, Stroke, and American Journal of Neuroradiology. Additionally, he has authored 16 books.

From 2017, he served as a Member of the regional committee of Europe for RSNA. He has also been involved with various committees, including the Neuroradiology/Head & Neck Subcommittee of the Scientific Program Committee of RSNA and the Guidelines Committee of the European Society for Cardiovascular Radiology. Furthermore, he has held positions in the Publication Committee of the American Society of Functional Neuroradiology, the Scientific Committee of the Italian Society of Vascular Medicine, and the ASNR Computer Science & Informatics Committee of the American Society of Neuroradiology.

== Books ==
- Computed Tomography - Clinical applications (2012), InTech.
- Computed Tomography - Special applications (2011), InTech.
- Multi-modality atherosclerosis Imaging and Diagnosis (2013), Springer.
- Abdomen and thoracic imaging: an engineering and clinical perspective (2013), Springer.
- Multi-Detector CT Imaging: Abdomen, Pelvis, and CAD Applications (2013), CRC Press.
- Multi-Detector CT Imaging: Head, Neck and Vascular System (2013), CRC Press.
- Imaging for Plastic Surgery (2014), CRC Press.
- Imaging in Neurodegenerative Disorders (2015), Oxford University Press.
- 3D Imaging technologies in Atheroslcerosis (2015), Springer.
- Ovarian Neoplasm Imaging (2015), Springer.
- Neurovascular Imaging: from Basics to Advanced Concepts (2016), Springer.
- Magnetic Resonance Imaging Handbook - Volume 1 - Image Principles, Neck, and the Brain (2016) CRC press
- Magnetic Resonance Imaging Handbook - Volume 2 - Imaging of the Cardiovascular System, Thorax, and Abdomen (2016) CRC press
- Magnetic Resonance Imaging Handbook - Volume 3 - Imaging of the Pelvis, Musculoskeletal System, and Special Applications to CAD (2016) CRC press
- Radiofrequency treatments on the spine (2017) Springer
- Neurological Disorders and Imaging Physics: Application of Multiple Sclerosis (2019) Iop

== Honors ==
In 2017, Saba was awarded the title of Cavaliere in the Order of Merit of the Italian Republic (OMRI)
