= HGPS =

HGPS may refer to:

- Progeria (Hutchinson–Gilford progeria syndrome)
- Hellisheiði Power Station, in Iceland
- Holy Ghost Preparatory School, in Bensalem, Pennsylvania, United States
- Hospital General de la Plaza de la Salud in the Dominican Republic
- LMNA, or Lamin A/C, a protein
- ROBO3, or Roundabout homolog 3, a protein

== See also ==
- HGP (disambiguation)
