= Wohlgemuth =

Wohlgemuth is a German surname. It belongs to the group of surnames originally descriptive of individual characteristics; the meaning of the word (in modern German orthography spelled wohlgemut) is either "happy, in good spirits" or "well-intentioned, kind"; it is also a German common name of either the starflower or of wild marjoram.

The surname has been on record since the 15th-century (then also spelled Wolgemut); an early bearer of the name was the painter Michael Wolgemut, the son of one Valentin Wolgemut of Nuremberg (recorded 1433); numerous other people with the surname are mentioned in Nuremberg archives later in the 15th century.

There were 2,063 entries for the surname in the German phonebook as of 2013, with no marked geographical distribution. The modernized spelling Wohlgemut also exists but is much rarer (50 entries).

Various derived spellings are in use in the USA, including Walgamotte, Wolgamot, Wolgamott, Wolgamuth, and Vulgamott. A Low Franconian (Dutch, Flemish, Afrikaans) variant of the name exists, spelled Welgemoed. A similar name of comparative rarity, with geographical distribution centered in Bavaria, is Wohlmuth.

== Persons bearing the name ==
- Arlene Wohlgemuth, the Republican nominee for the 17th Congressional District of Texas in 2004
- Franz Wohlgemuth, Austrian bobsledder
- Gustav Adolf Wohlgemuth, German and English business person and psychologist
- Mikkel Wohlgemuth, Danish footballer
- Walter A. Wohlgemuth, German radiologist

== Variants ==
- Jillian Wolgemuth (born 1998), American field hockey player
- Robert Wolgemuth (1948–2026), American author and chairman of the Evangelical Christian Publishers Association
- Michael Wolgemut (1434–1519), German painter and printmaker
