= Burton Drayer =

American radiologist

- Citizenship: American
- Education: University of Pennsylvania, Chicago Medical School, University of Vermont College of Medicine, University of Pittsburgh Medical Center
- Known for: X-ray computed tomography and Magnetic resonance imaging
- Medical career
- Profession: Professor, physician, researcher
- Field: Radiology
- Institutions: The Mount Sinai Hospital, Mount Sinai Morningside, Mount Sinai West

Burton Drayer, MD, FACR, FANN, is an American radiologist and nationally recognized authority on the use of computed tomography and magnetic resonance imaging for diagnosing neurological disorders. From 2003 to 2008, he served as president, The Mount Sinai Hospital. As of 2020, he is the Charles M. and Marilyn Newman Professor and System Chair, Radiology, for The Mount Sinai Health System and Icahn School of Medicine at Mount Sinai Hospital in New York City.

Drayer is the author of more than 200 publications and 41 book chapters and was a consulting editor for Neuroimaging Clinics of North America from 1991 to 2005. He was elected president-elect of the Radiological Society of North America in 2014 and was listed in New York Magazine's Best Doctors from 1996 to 2009.

== Biography ==
=== Education ===
Drayer earned an A.B. in political science from the University of Pennsylvania in 1967. He earned his medical degree from Chicago Medical School in 1971 and completed residencies in neurology at the University of Vermont College of Medicine and in diagnostic radiology at the University of Pittsburgh Medical Center. He completed a fellowship in neuroradiology at the University of Pittsburgh Medical Center in 1978. He is board certified in radiology, neuroradiology, and neurology.

=== Professional appointments ===
From 1978 to 1979, Drayer was director of Neuroradiology at the University of Pittsburgh Children's Hospital. Until 1984 he served as chief of neuroradiology at Duke University Medical Center in Durham, North Carolina, then, until 1986, director of neuroimaging. Drayer then joined the St. Joseph's Hospital and Medical Center in Phoenix, Arizona, where, until 1995, he served as radiologist-in-chief and director of magnetic resonance imaging and research at the Barrow Neurological Institute. In 1995 he joined Mount Sinai Hospital as director of radiology. He is currently Professor and chair at the Department of Radiology at Mount Sinai. From 2003 to 2008, Drayer served as president of Mount Sinai Hospital and executive vice president for hospital and clinical affairs for The Mount Sinai Medical Center. He continues as executive vice president for risk. In 2011 he was elected as chair of the Radiological Society of North America (RSNA) Research & Education (R&E) Foundation Board of Trustees. In November 2014, Drayer was named president of Mount Sinai Hospital and executive vice president for hospital and clinical affairs of Mount Sinai Medical Center.

=== Research ===
Drayer's research focus includes Parkinson's disease, aging, neurodegenerative disease, Alzheimer's disease, cerebral infarction, vascular malformation advanced CT and MRI techniques for the diagnosis of brain neoplasm. He is known for brain iron, neurodegeneration, MR angiographyn, brain infarction, Xenon CT regional cerebral blood flow, atomic, physiologic and functional imaging of the aging brain, and the application of artificial intelligence (AI) in patients with acute neurological conditions.

=== Journals ===
Drayer has served as a reviewer for the American Journal of Neuroradiology, The New England Journal of Medicine, Radiology, the Journal of Computerized Tomography, Neurosurgery, Annals of Neurology, Stroke, Neurology, and the Journal of Magnetic Resonance Imaging. He serves on the editorial advisory boards of US Radiology. Drayer is past president of The American Society of Neuroradiology. He also was president (1995–2001) and founding member of the Neuroradiology Education and Research Foundation of the American Society of Neuroradiology. He served on the board of directors of the Radiological Society of North America since 2003 and was president of the board in 2011. He currently chairs the Radiological Society of North America Research and Education Foundation.

== Awards and honors ==
- 2016 Honorary Membership of the European Society of Radiology
- 2011 President, Radiological Society of North America
- 2010 President-Elect, Radiological Society of North America
- 2008 Distinguished Service Award, American Board of Radiology
- 1998 Fellow, American College of Radiology
- 1993 Distinguished Alumnus Award, Chicago Medical School
- 1982 Fellow, American Academy of Neurology
- 1977 Cornelius G. Dyke Award, American Society of Neuroradiology
- 1977 First Prize President's Award, Pittsburgh Roentgen Ray Society

== Books ==
- Keller PJ, Drayer BP, Fram EK: Magnetic Resonance Angiography, Vol 2(4) Neuroimaging Clinics of North America, Drayer BP (Consulting Editor), W.B. Saunders, Philadelphia, 1992; pp 835
- Brasch RC: MRI Contrast Enhancement in the Central Nervous System. A Case Approach. (Assoc. Eds., Drayer BP, Haughton VM, Jinkins JR, Nelson KL, Sze G); Raven Press 1993, pp 334 ISBN 0-7817-0116-3

== Publications ==
Drayer has a H-index of 44 and there are more than 20,000 citations of his publications.

Partial list of peer-reviewed articles:

- Titano, JJ; Badgeley, M; Schefflein, J; Pain, M; Su, A; Cai, M; Swinburne, N; Zech, J; Kim, J; Bederson, J; Mocco, J; Drayer, B; Lehar, J; Cho, S; Costa, A; Oermann, EK (2018). "Automated deep-neural-network surveillance of cranial images for acute neurologic events". Nat Med. 24: 1337–1341. doi:10.1038/s41591-018-0147-y. PMID 30104767.
- Drayer BP, Gur D, Yonas H, Wolfson Jr SK, Cook EE (1980). "Abnormality of the xenon brain:blood partition coefficient and blood flow in cerebral infarction: an in vivo assessment using transmission computed tomography". Radiology. 135 (2): 349–54. doi:10.1148/radiology.135.2.6768103. PMID 6768103.
- Drayer BP, Schmeckel DE, Hedlund LW, Lischko MM, Sage MR, Heinz ER, Dubois PJ, Goulding PL (1982). "Radiographic quantitation of reversible blood–brain barrier disruption in vivo". Radiology. 143 (1): 85–9. doi:10.1148/radiology.143.1.6801727. PMID 6801727.
- Drayer BP, Burger P, Hurwitz B, Dawson D, Cain J, Leong J, Herfkens R, Johnson GA (1987). "Magnetic resonance imaging in multiple sclerosis: decreased signal in thalamus and putamen". Annals of Neurology. 22 (4): 546–50. doi:10.1002/ana.410220418. PMID 3435073. S2CID 11740521.
- Drayer BP (1988). "Imaging of the aging brain. Part II. Pathologic conditions". Radiology. 166 (3): 797–806. doi:10.1148/radiology.166.3.3277248. PMID 3277248.
- Rigamonti D, Hadley MN, Drayer BP, Johnson PC, Hoenig-Rigamonti K, Knight JT, Spetzler RF (1988). "Cerebral cavernous malformations. Incidence and familial occurrence". The New England Journal of Medicine. 319 (6): 343–7. doi:10.1056/NEJM198808113190605. PMID 3393196.
- Dean BL, Drayer BP, Bird CR, Flom RA, Hodak JA, Coons SW, Carey RG (1990). "Gliomas: classification with MR imaging". Radiology. 174 (2): 411–5. doi:10.1148/radiology.174.2.2153310. PMID 2153310.
- Heiserman JE, Drayer BP, Keller PJ, Fram EK (1992). "Intracranial vascular stenosis and occlusion: evaluation with three-dimensional time-of-flight MR angiography". Radiology. 185 (3): 667–73. doi:10.1148/radiology.185.3.1438743. PMID 1438743.
- Keller PJ, Karis JP, Fram EK, Heiserman JE, Drayer BP (1996). "An alternative to GRASE: toward spin-echo-like contrast with independent reconstruction of gradient-echo images". Magnetic Resonance in Medicine. 36 (5): 804–8. doi:10.1002/mrm.1910360523. PMID 8916034. S2CID 10657863.
- Ricci PE, Karis JP, Heiserman JE, Fram EK, Bice AN, Drayer BP (1998). "Differentiating recurrent tumor from radiation necrosis: time for re-evaluation of positron emission tomography?". American Journal of Neuroradiology. 19 (3): 407–13. PMC 8338276. PMID 9541290.
