= The Neuroradiology Journal =

- Discipline: Neuroradiology
- Language: English
- Edited by: Luca_Saba

Publication details
- History: 1994-present
- Publisher: SAGE Publications
- Frequency: Bimonthly
- Impact factor: 1.2 (2022)

Standard abbreviations
- ISO 4: Neuroradiol. J.

Indexing
- ISSN: 1971-4009 (print); 2385-1996 (web)
- OCLC no.: 664157235

Links
- Journal homepage; Online access; Online archive

The Neuroradiology Journal is a bimonthly peer-reviewed medical journal covering diagnostic neuroradiology. It was established in 1994 and is published by SAGE Publications. The editor-in-chief is Luca_Saba (University_of_Cagliari).

== Abstracting and indexing ==
The journal is abstracted and indexed in:

- CINAHL Plus
- Embase
- Index Medicus//MEDLINE/PubMed
- Scopus
- ESCI
