= Drayer =

Drayer is a surname. Notable people with the surname include:

- Burton Drayer, American radiologist
- Clarence Drayer (1901–1977), American football player
- Michael Drayer (born 1986), American actor
- Shannon Drayer, American sports journalist

== See also ==
- Draper (surname)
- Dreyer
- Grayer
