= Richard Forster (photographer) =

Swiss photographer (born 1940)

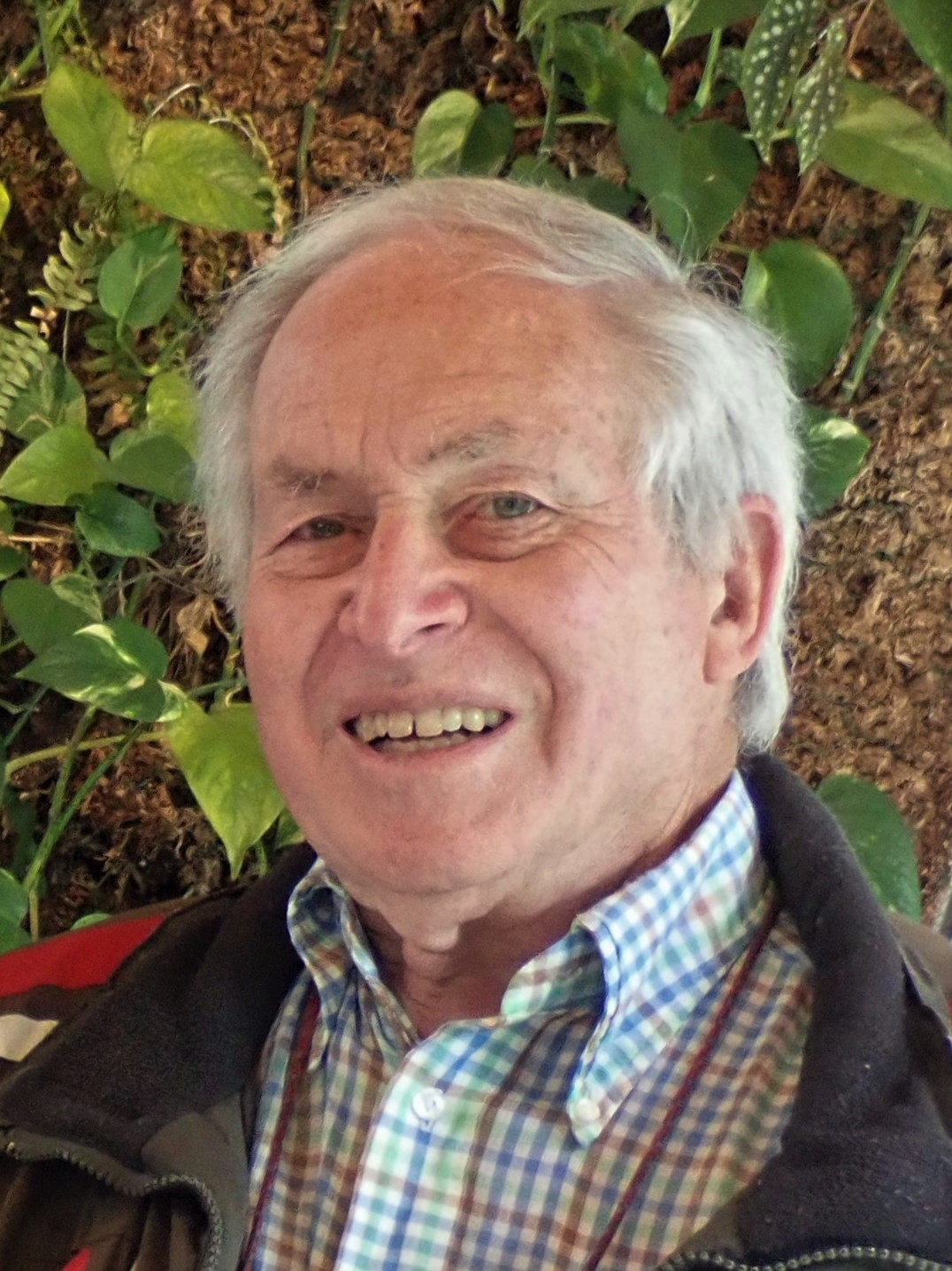
- Forster in Geneva, 2021
- Born: 8 November 1940; Geneva, Switzerland
- Died: 21 January 2025 (aged 84); Geneva
- Known for: Nude photography
- Website: www.aphroditephoto.net

Richard Forster (born 8 November 1940, in Geneva, Switzerland, died 21 January 2025, also in Geneva) was a Swiss photographer and mechanical engineer. He is best known for nude photography in natural environments. His consistency and perseverance produced an opus which brought him recognition beyond Switzerland and France.

== Career ==
Forster was born on 8 November 1940, in Geneva to father Walter, a linotypist and to mother Marie, born Wohlgemuth. They moved to Geneva in 1939 from the canton of Solothurn. He graduated in 1965 from the École Technique Supérieure, also in Geneva, as Ingénieur en mécanique (mechanical engineer).

He worked in chemical construction development, electromechanical and machine-tool sales, armament development. From 1981, he taught mechanics and other subjects in the Technical Vocational Training Center in Geneva.

== Photography ==
Forster obtained his first camera at twelve, a Kodak Brownie 127. Later, he switched to Rolleiflex 4x4 (gray) for black and white and the Voigtländer Vito BL for color photography. He designed and made a waterproof box for the Rolleiflex with which he shot his first underwater photos during the summer of 1957, at the French Riviera. In 1958, he took the photography course at the Société Genevoise de Photographie (SGP, Geneva Society of Photography) where he later also participated in teaching and other activities.

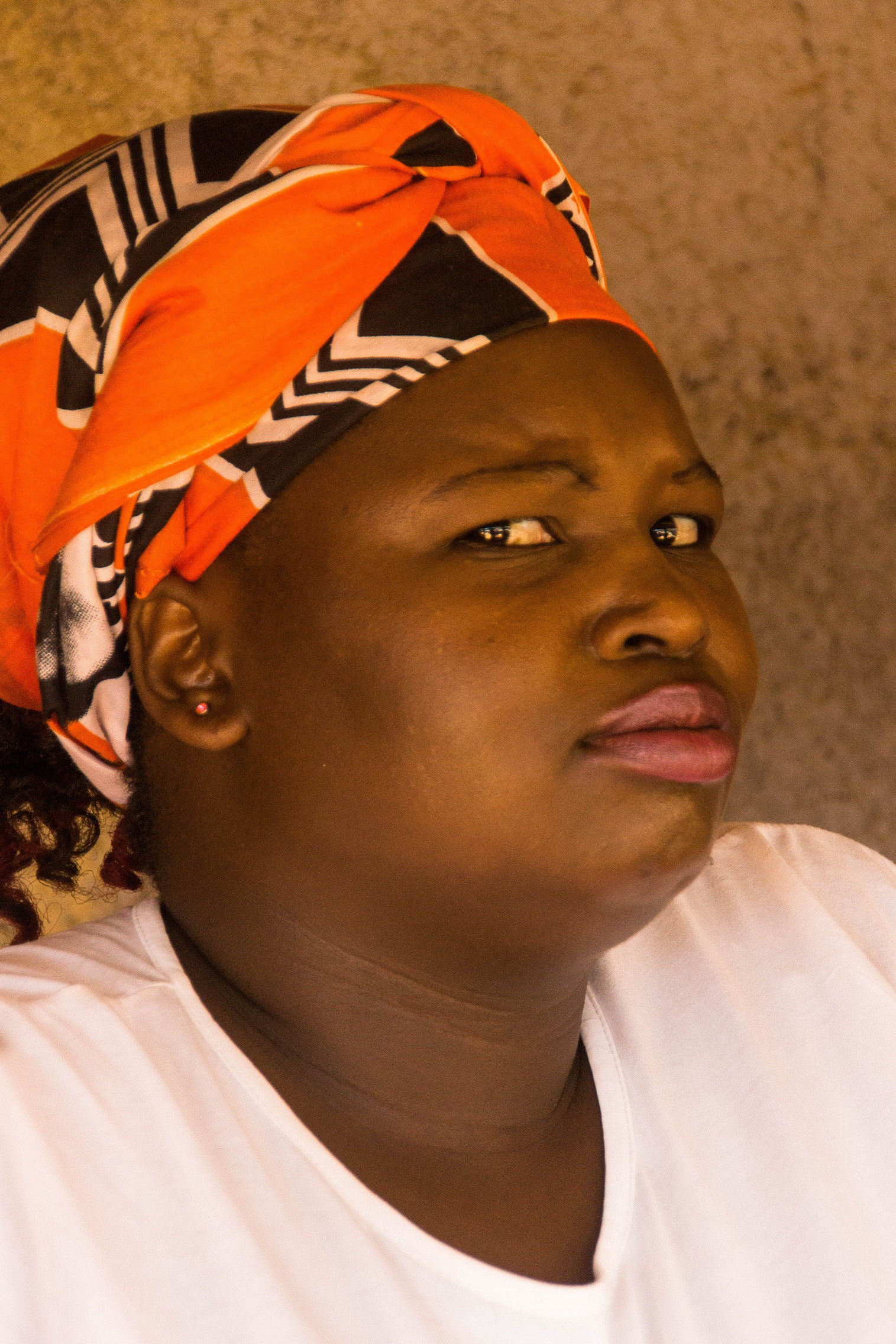
Woman in Johannesburg, 2018

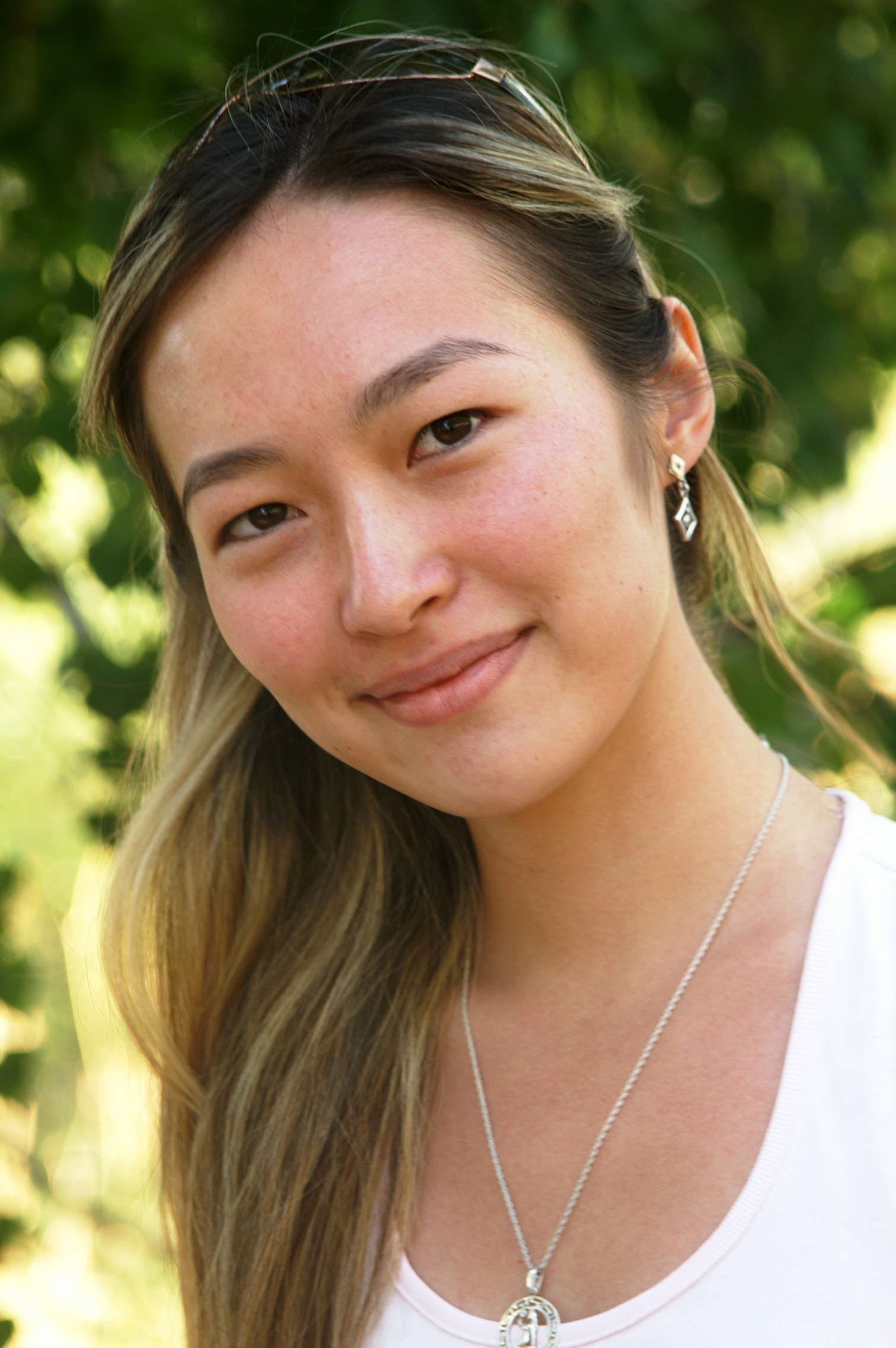
Woman in Bishkek, 2008

According to Forster he decided to advance his photography by traveling on money saved working as a gas station attendant during his school holidays. In the summer of 1961 he hitchhiked to Hamburg, in 1962 to Italy, Yugoslavia and over the Cappadocia to the Syrian border of Turkey. In 1963, he and his future wife Anne-Marie Riedel traveled to Scotland, in 1964 they visited the Expo 64 exhibition in Lausanne and in 1965 the most western point of the continent, Sagres in Portugal. In later years the destinations were Switzerland, Sicily, Cyprus, Venice, Paris, the American West in 1994 and 1999, and Ksar Ghilane in Tunisia. After the death of Anne-Marie in 2007 Forster traveled to Tunisia, in 2008 to China, Kyrgyzstan and Egypt, in 2009 to Vietnam, Kenya and Lanzarote. In 2010 it was Morocco, Paris, Japan; in 2011 India – Rajasthan, Cappadocia and Corsica. In 2012 he visited Indochina (Vietnam, Laos, Cambodia) and Cuba, in 2013 Iceland. In 2014 the destinations were Spain and Peru, in 2015 Myanmar, Tokyo and Brittany. After he met his new partner he traveled with her to Thailand and Jordan in 2016, in 2017 to Corsica, in 2018 to South Africa, China and Tibet, in 2019 to South India and Colombia.

Although Forster's travel opus consists mainly of landscapes and reportage photos, he considered portraits as the best part of his travel photography.

== Nude photography ==
During the honeymoon in Portugal, 1965, he took the first outdoor nude photos on an Algarve beach. In the seventies he and Anne-Marie joined the naturism movement and during the family summer vacations on nude beaches Forster could meet models for nude photography among acquaintances. Later he also did not use professional models, he met them during casual encounters and over the Internet.

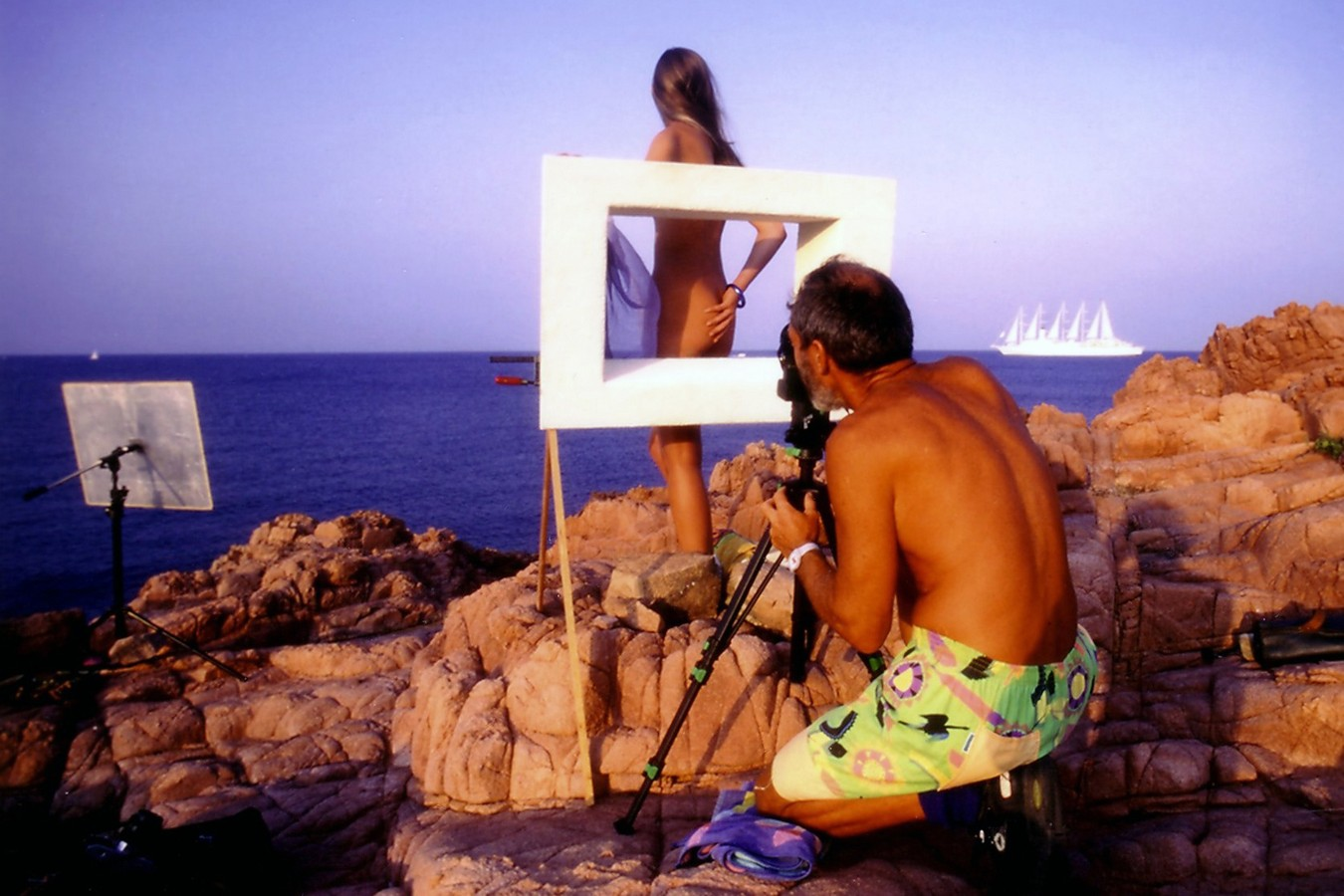
Forster and model, Corsica 1995

For his nude photography he chose the venues close to the water such as the seashore and rocks, sometimes also non-natural outdoor places such as empty urban spaces or abandoned ruins. In 1987, during a vernissage of a photo exhibition of Serge Nazarieff, Forster met Pierre Strinati, a biologist and caver who was also involved in cave nude photography. This led to own cave nudes in one of the Swiss show caves, the Vallorbe caves. He also experimented with striped light effects on the body and with symmetrical, reflected compositions. The issues concerning the nude photography could be illustrated by his citation:

Nude photography is, of course, always on the razor's edge. Everyone perceives the result differently, depending on their education, culture or age.

Forster's works have appeared in photo magazines and books. He has participated in national and international photo contests and his works have also been selected as photo of the year.

== Solo exhibitions ==
As of 2022 Forster had the following personal exhibitions, in Switzerland and in France:
- 1987 Paysages et Aphrodite [Landscapes and Aphrodite] Galerie La Mansarde, Veyrier
- 1990 Corps en liberté [Body set free] Galerie des Unions Chrétiennes, Geneva
- 1993 Rêve entre porte et fenêtre [Dream between the door and the window] Galerie Decovision, Grenchen
- 1995 Femme [Woman] Galerie du Jardin Alpin, Meyrin
- 1997 Femmes de lumière [Women of light] Galerie La Mansarde, Veyrier
- 1998 Miroir de femmes [She and the mirror] Galerie Dow Chemical, Meyrin
- 1998 Portraits d'Américains [Portraits of Americans] Galerie Expo Forum, Geneva
- 1998 Filles de la mer [Sea girls] Galerie Photo Finish, Carouge
- 1999 Adam [Adam] Galerie de l'Horloge TPG, Geneva
- 1999 Promenade en Bretagne [Promenade in Brittany] Galerie Expo Forum, Geneva
- 2000 Lumières intérieures [Interior lights] Galerie Racines, Brétigny
- 2000 Encadrements [Frames] Galerie Ferme Rosset, Troinex
- 2002 Le miroir complice [Mirror power] Galerie Corps et Âme, Geneva
- 2002 Éternel féminin [Eternal feminine] Galerie de l'Horloge TPG, Geneva
- 2004 Sirènes [Sirens] Galerie Delafontaine, Carouge
- 2004 Hot nylon [Hot nylons] Galerie O Mots Doux, Geneva
- 2008 Graffiti sexy [Sexy graffiti] Galerie Ferme Rosset, Troinex
- 2009 Roches sensuelles [Sensual rocks] Galerie La Mansarde, Veyrier
- 2010 Femmes sublimes [Sublime women] Galerie de l'Horloge TPG, Geneva
- 2020 Ondines [Undines] Galerie Le Clin d'oeil, Corsier

== Gallery ==
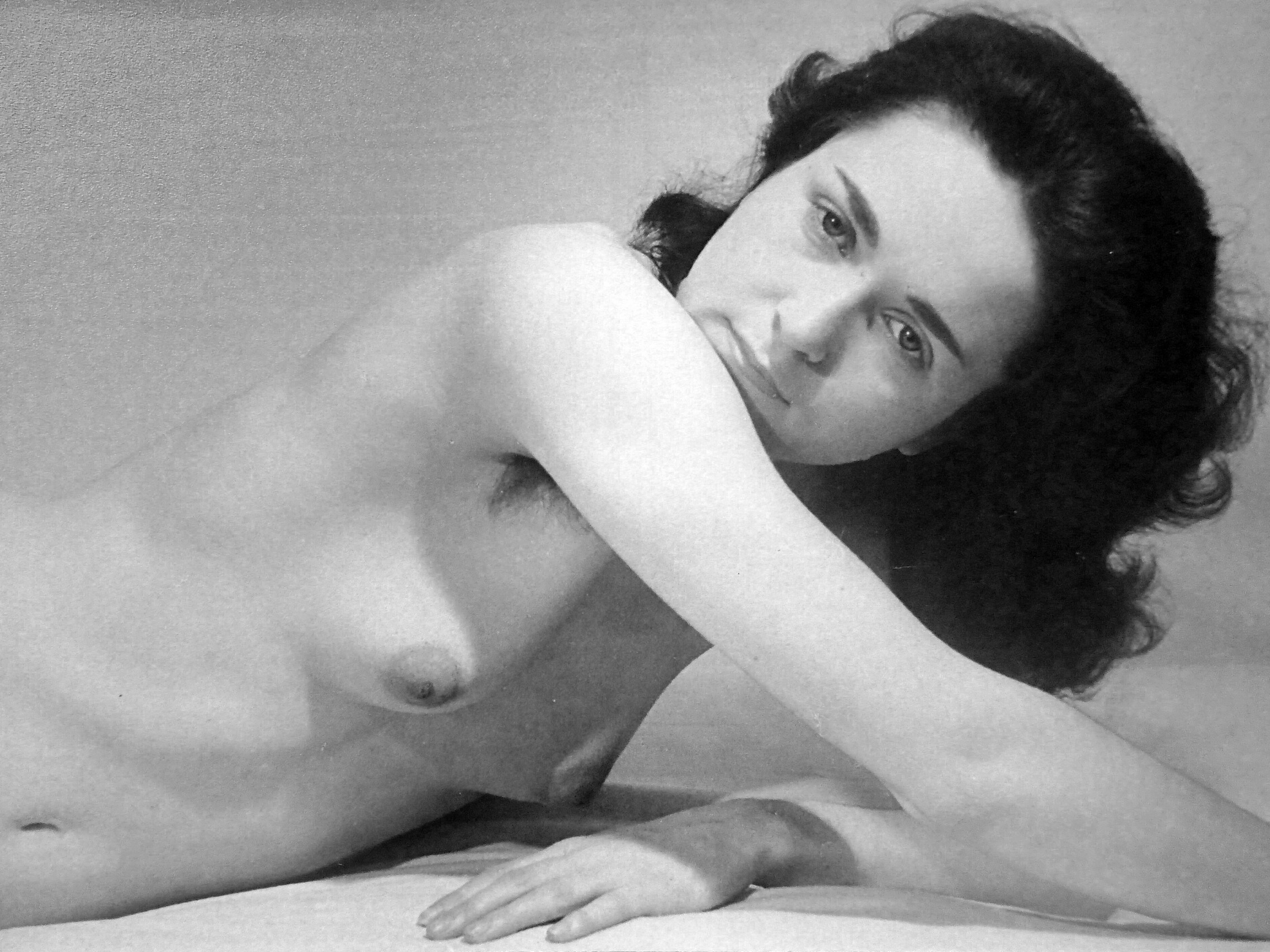
My muse, 1963

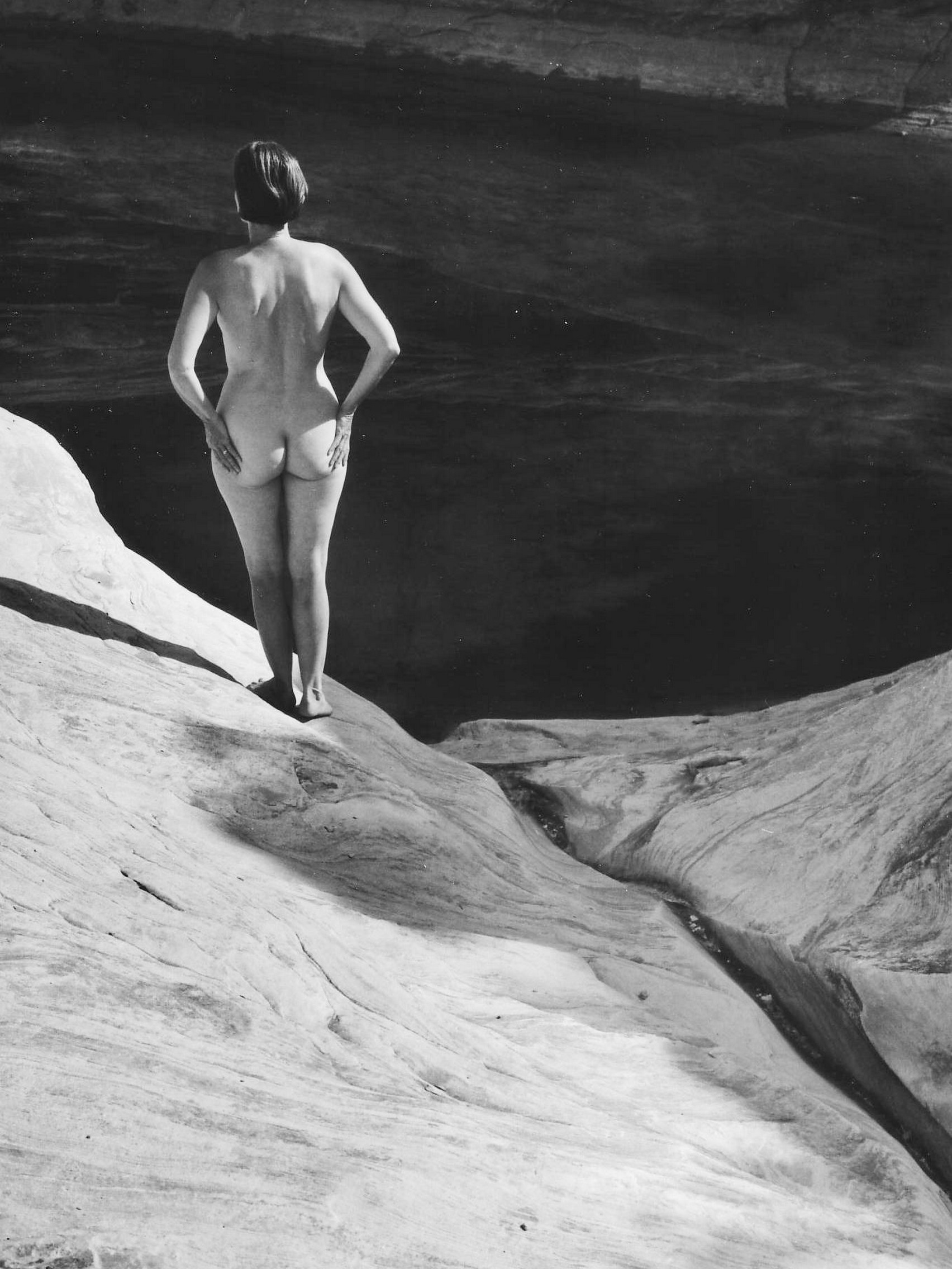
Nude standing on a rock slope, 1994

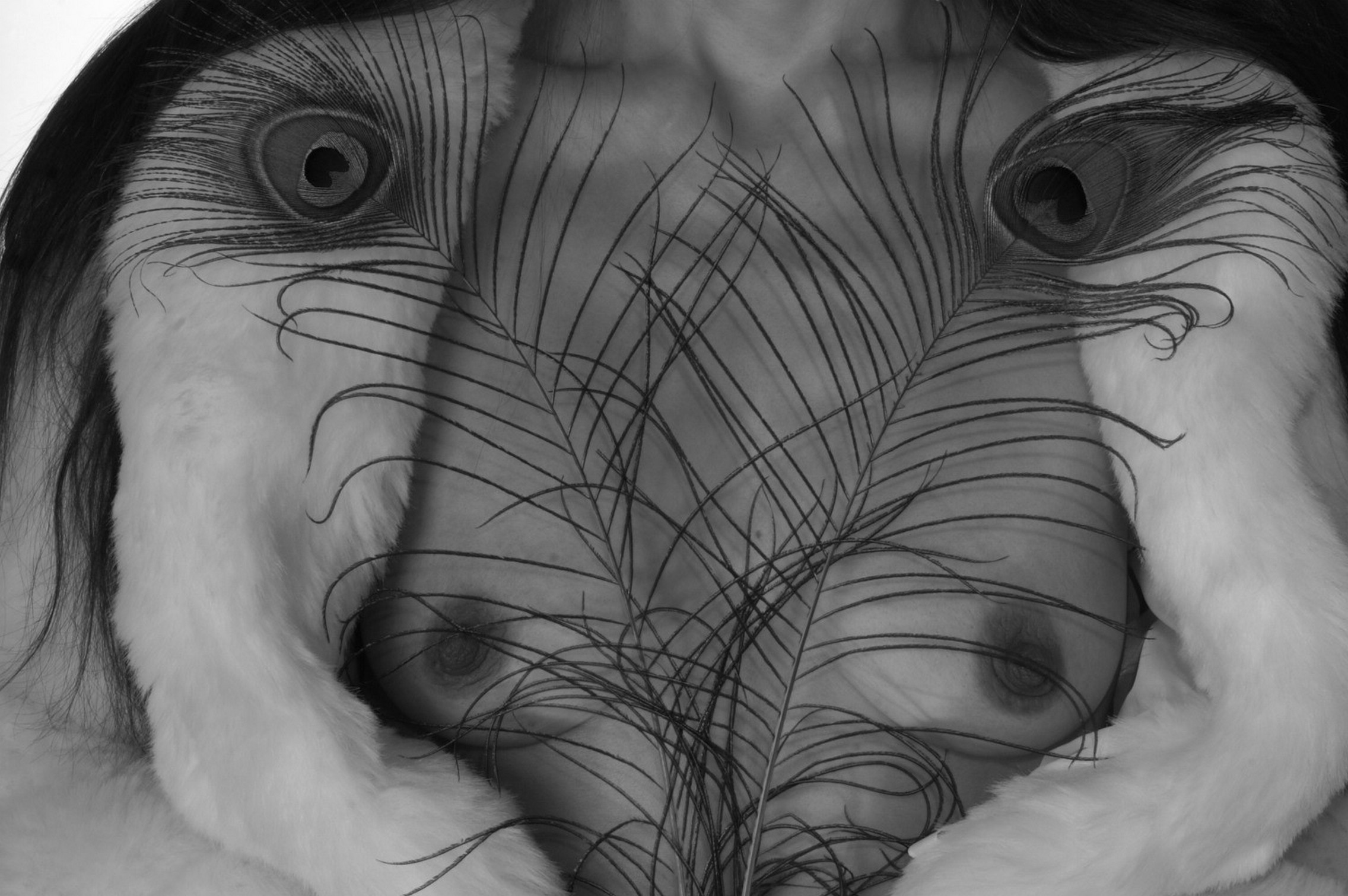
Semi-nude with feathers, 2005

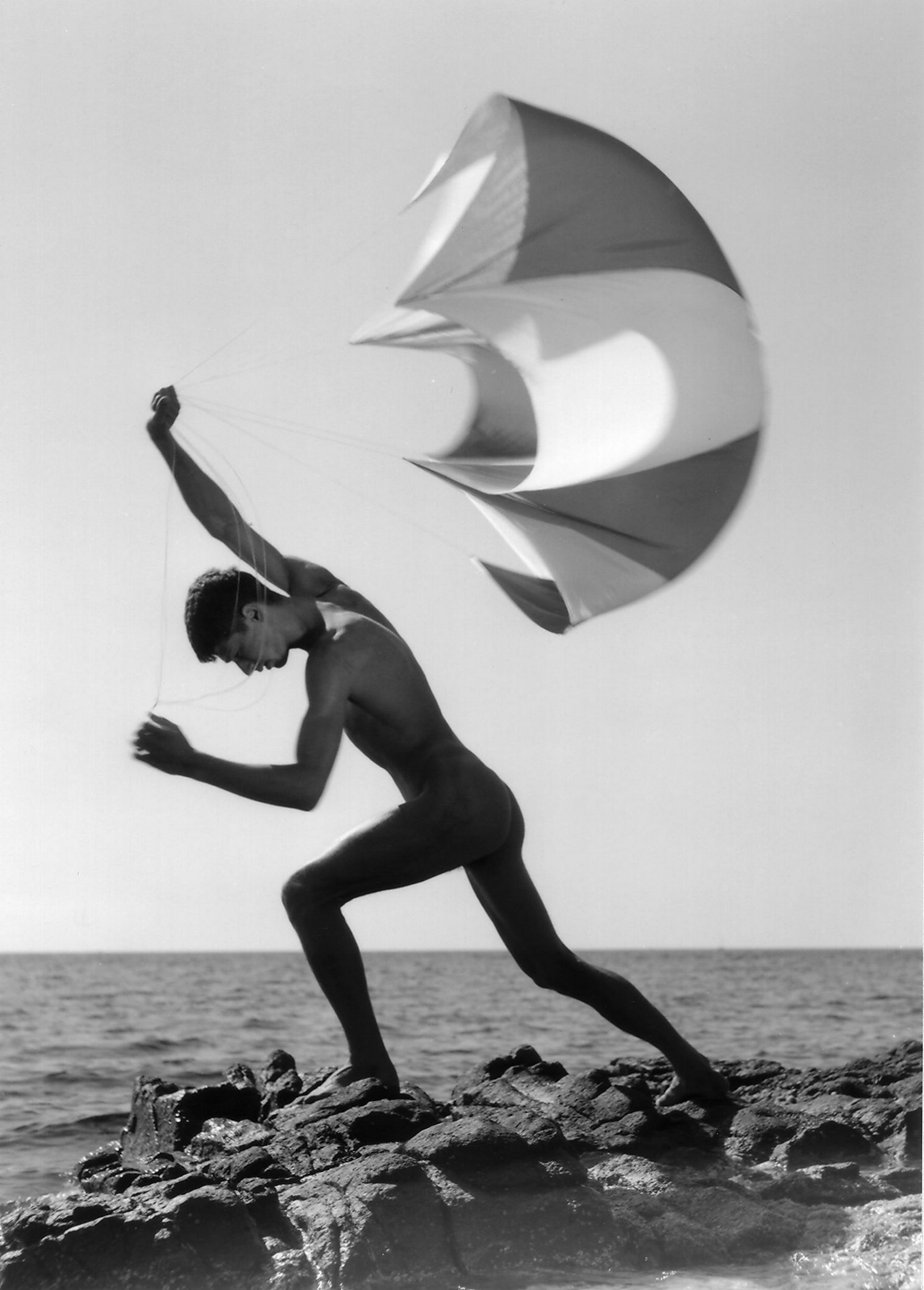
Dance of the wind, 1995

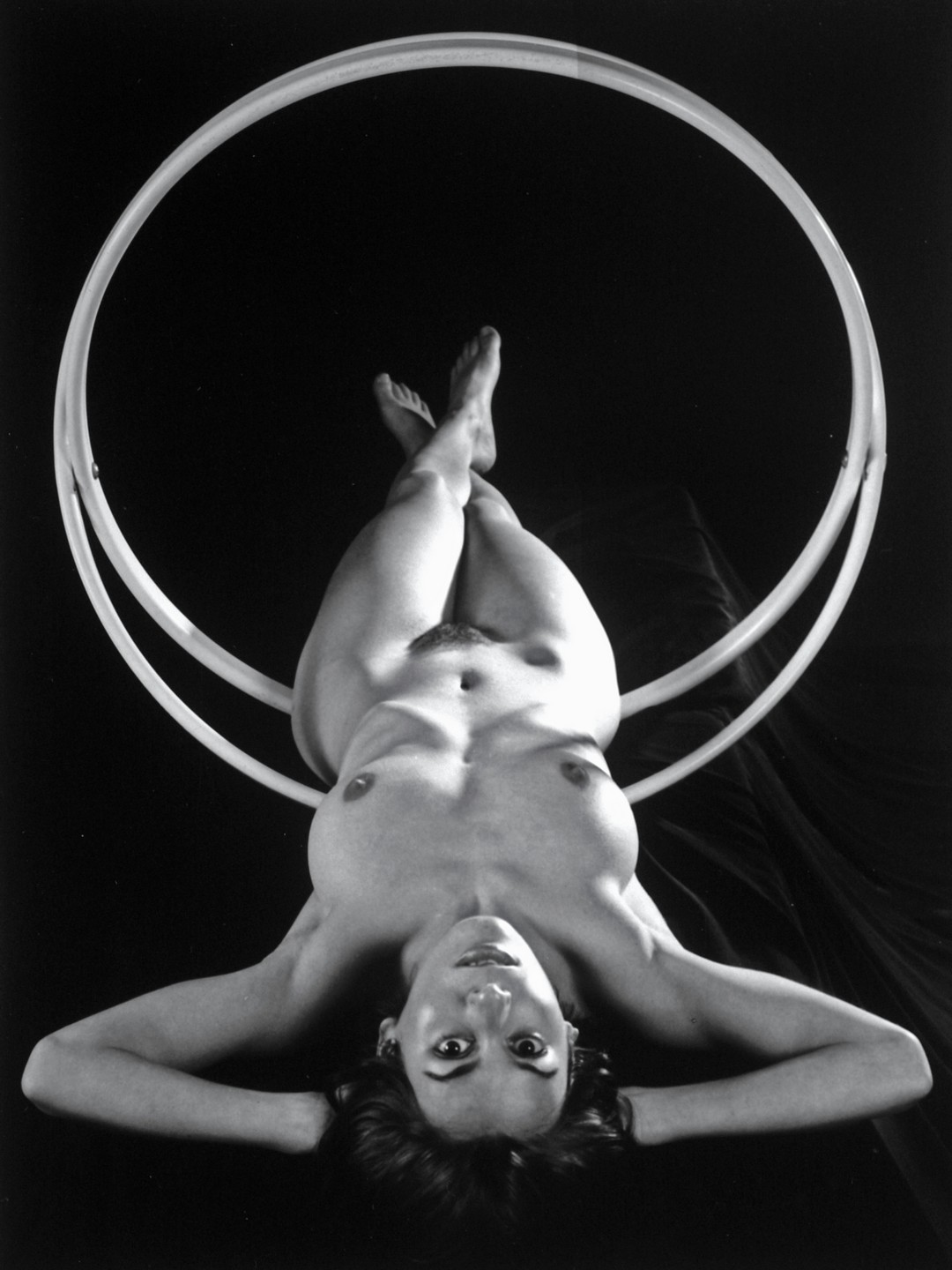
Encircled body, 2000

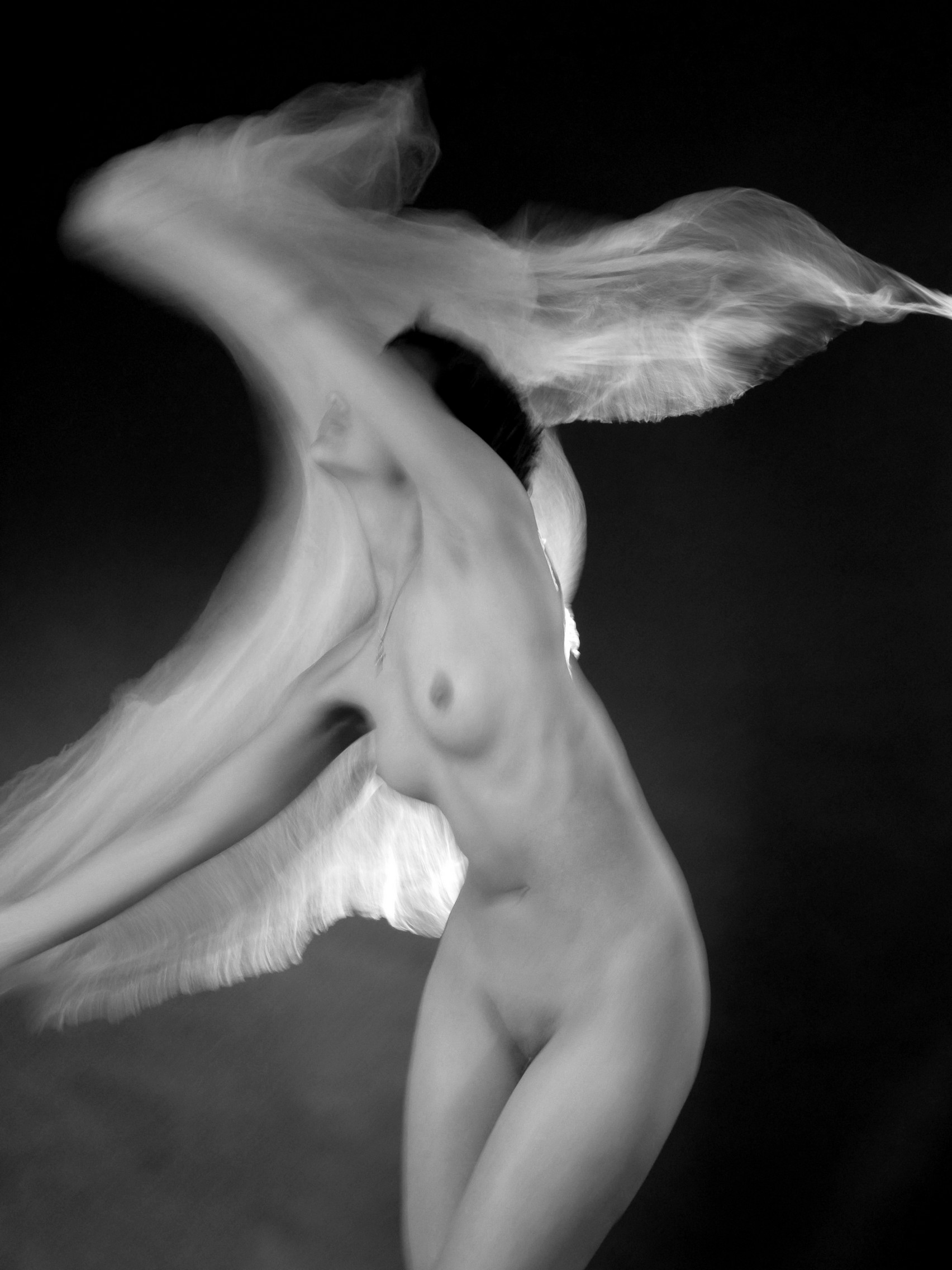
Nude with a veil, 2010

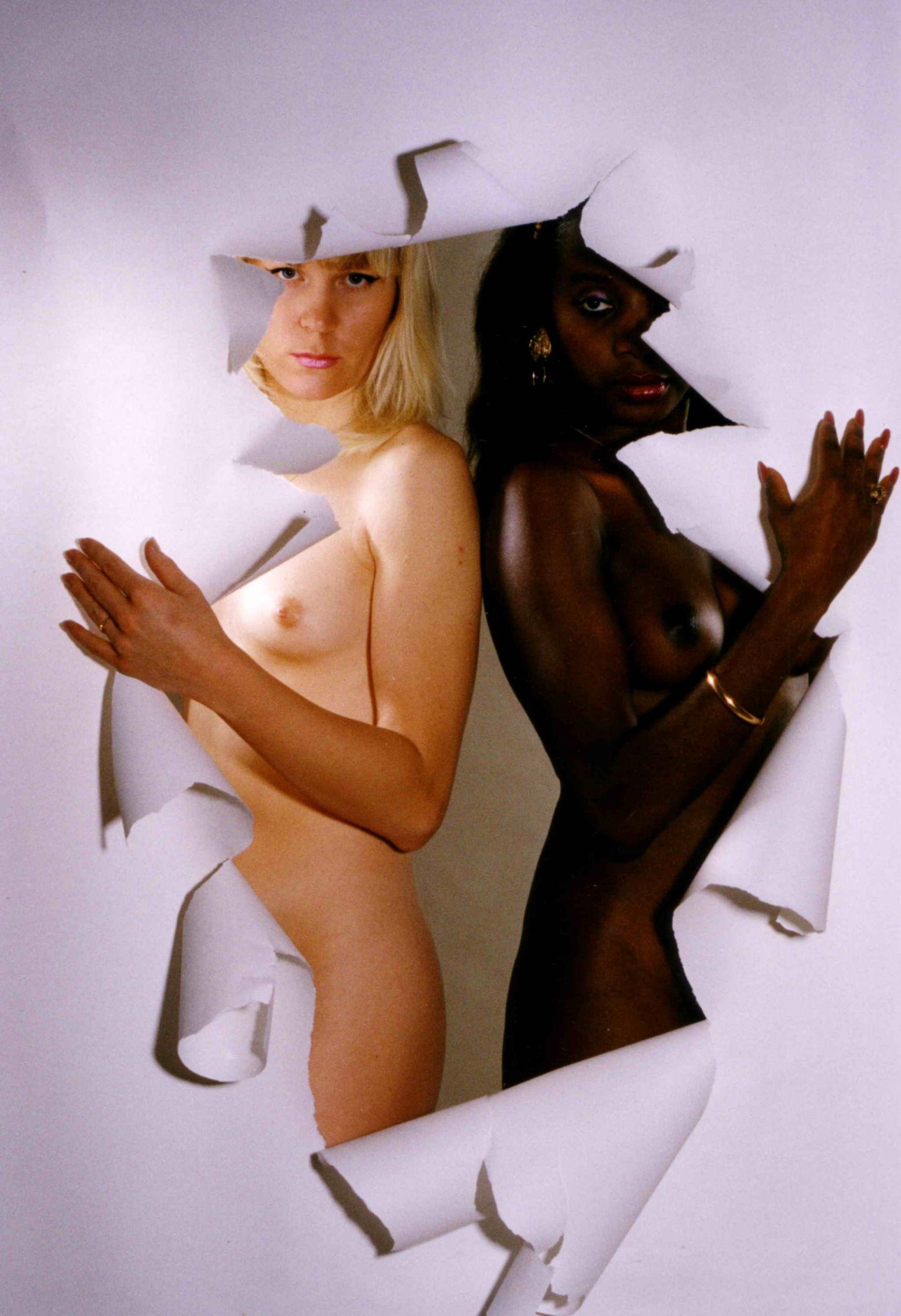
Tearing, 1992

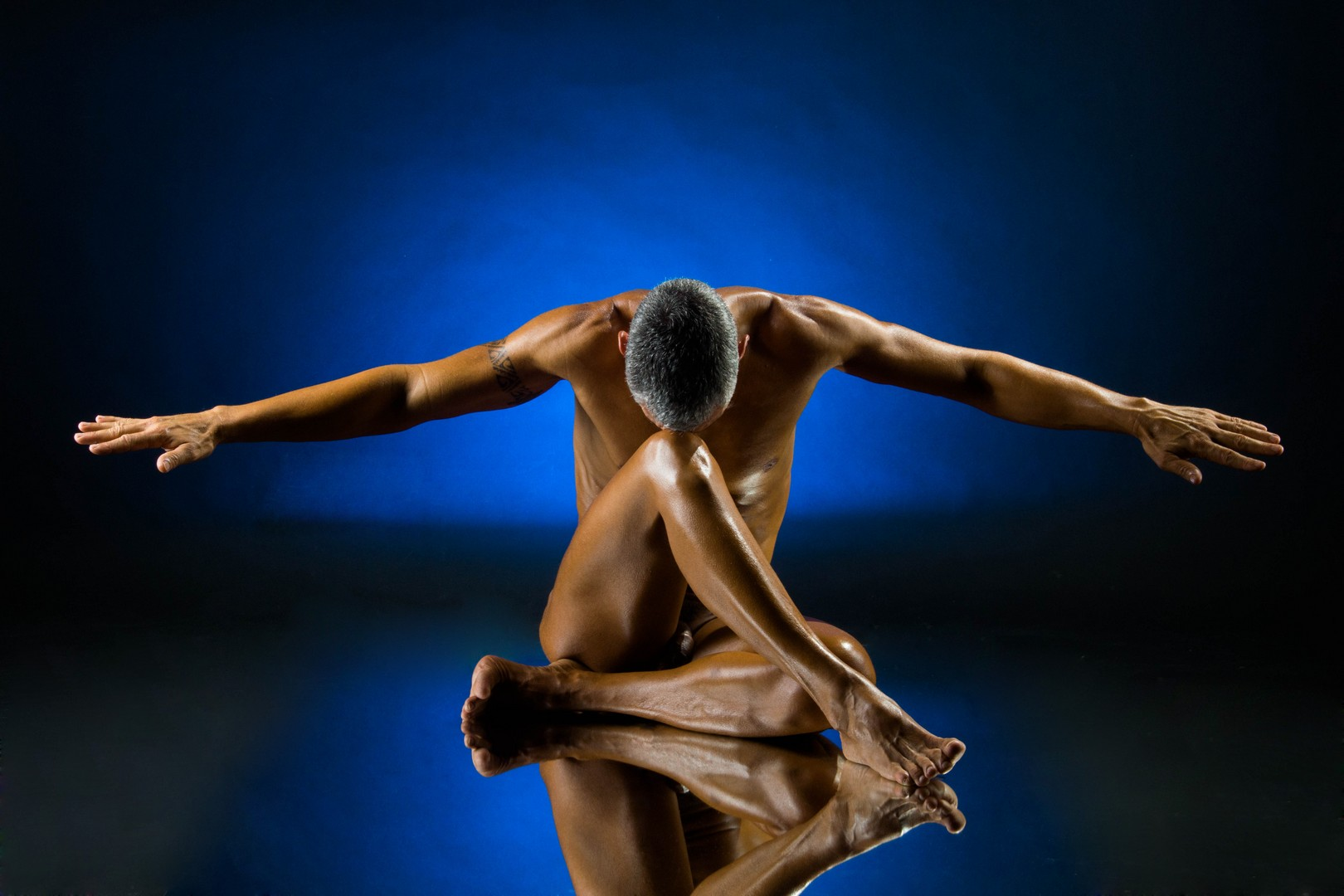
Meditation in blue, 2016

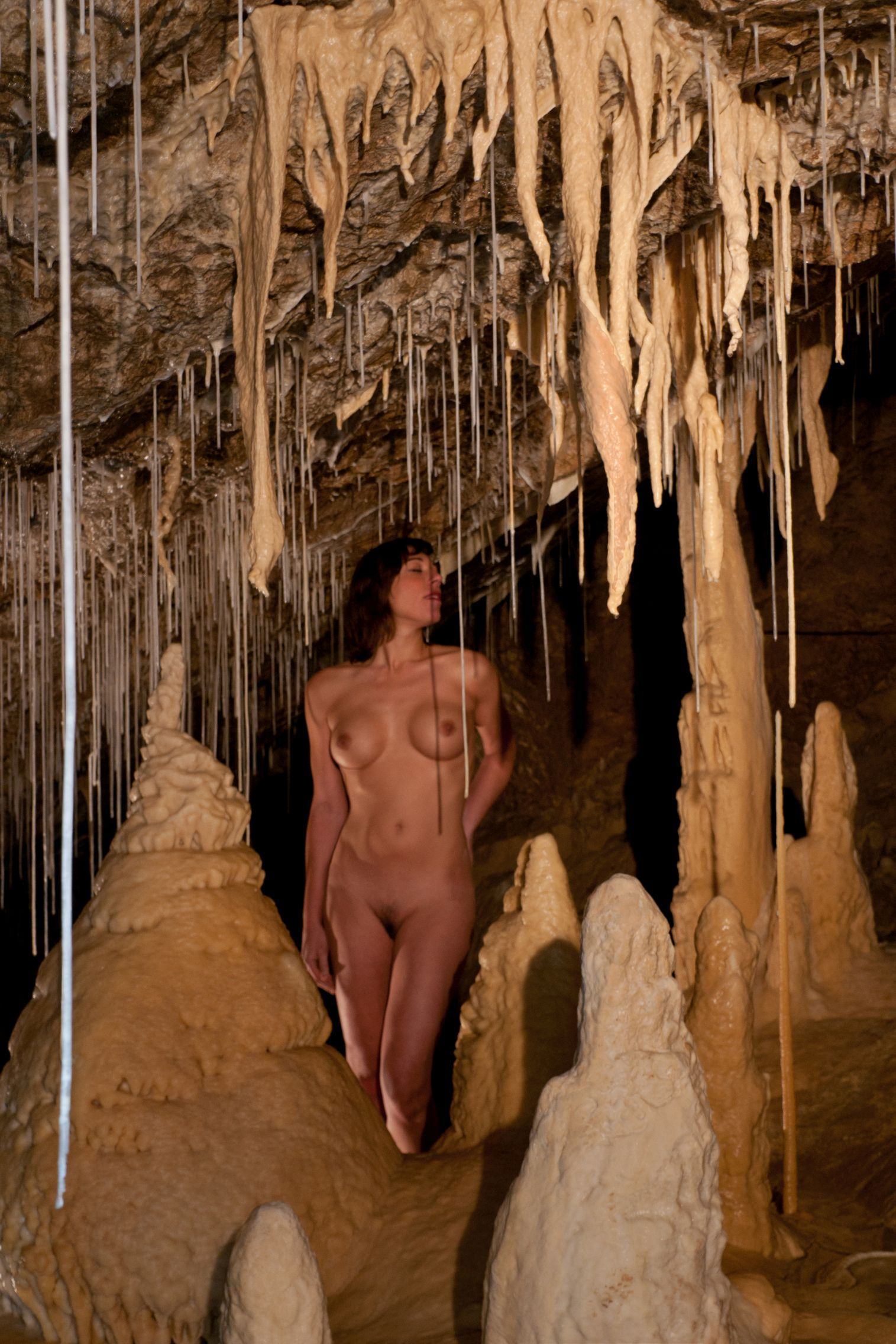
Hall of needles, 2011

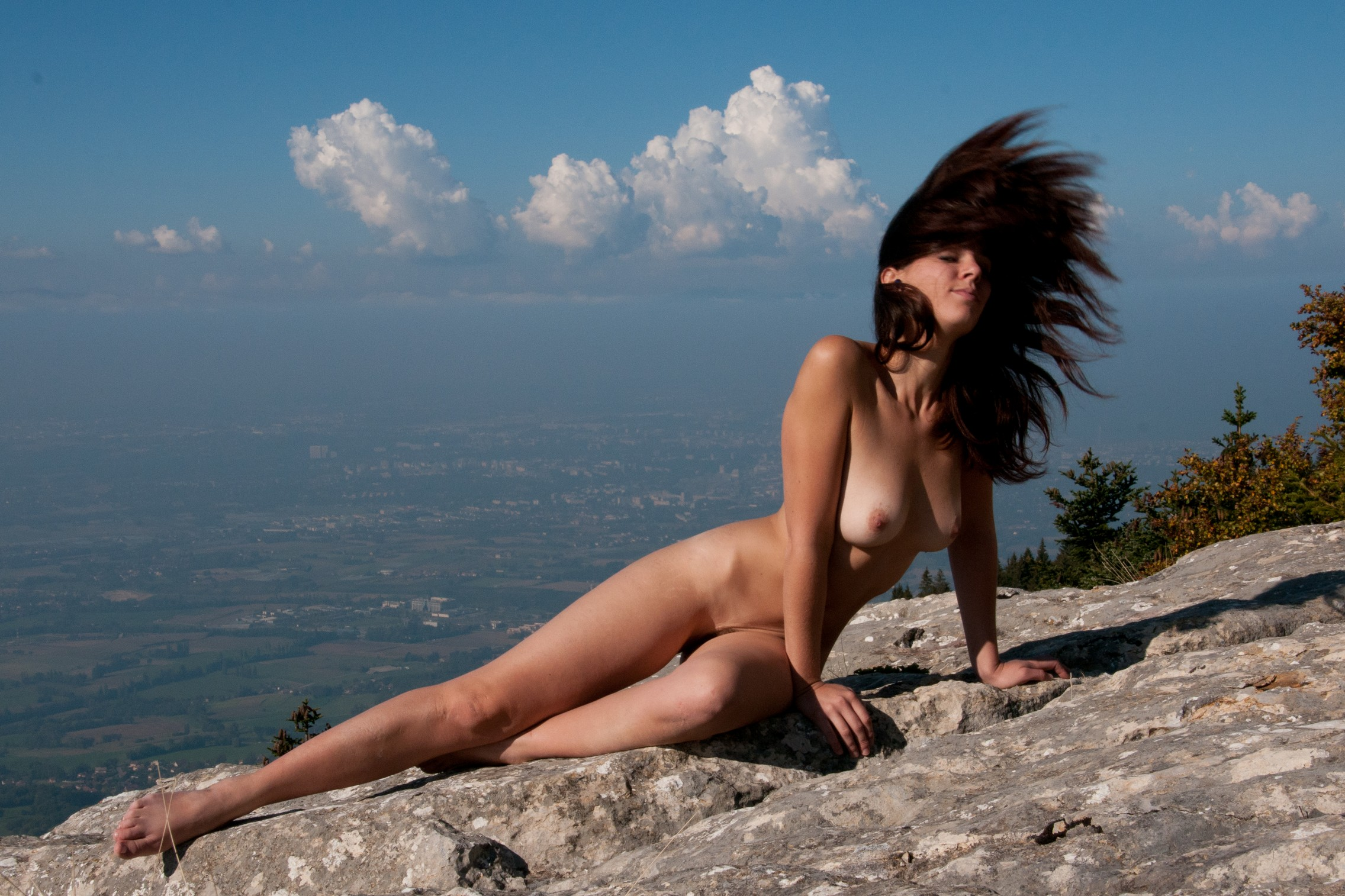
Reclining nude in the wind, 2011

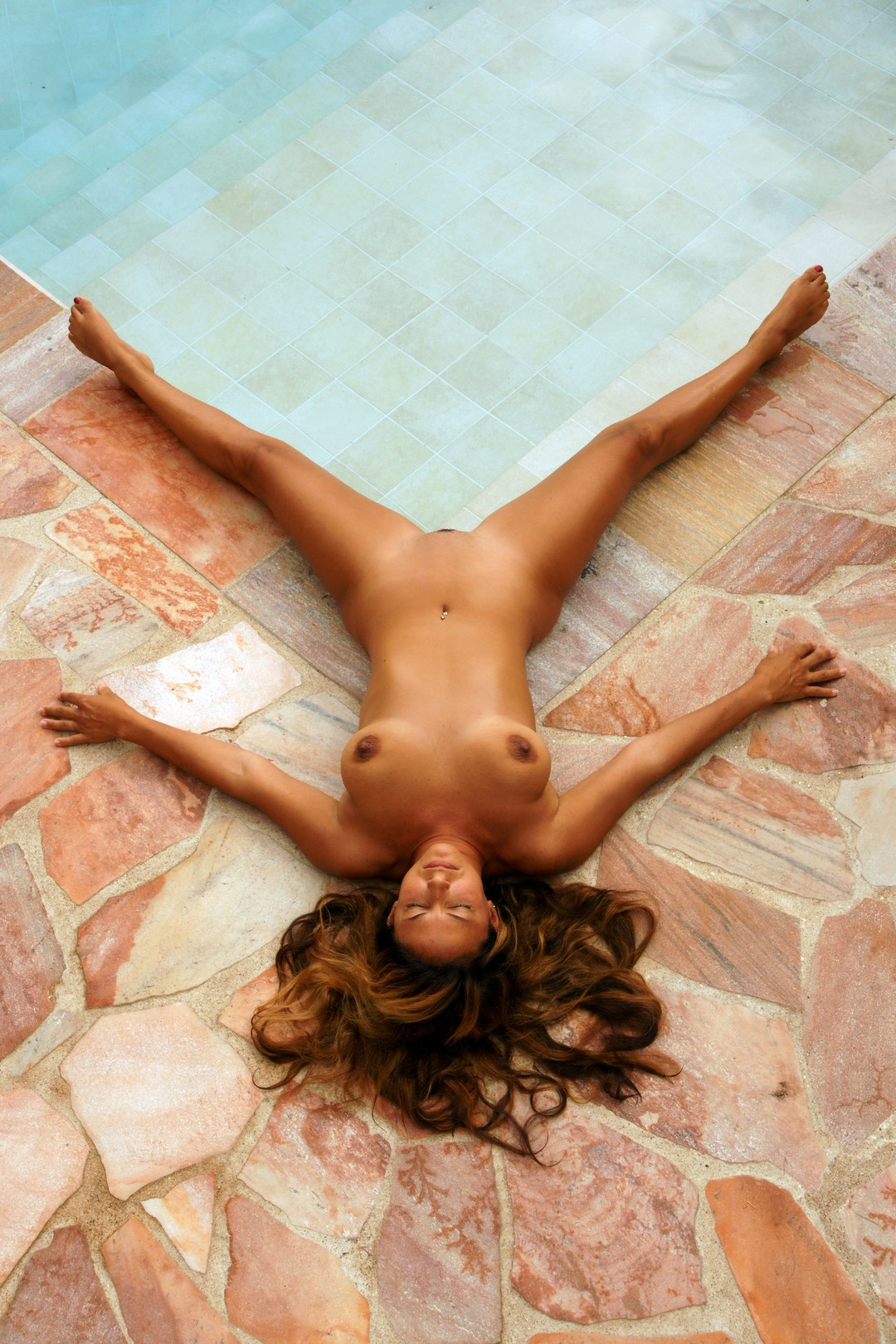
Nude on the back at the pool, 2009

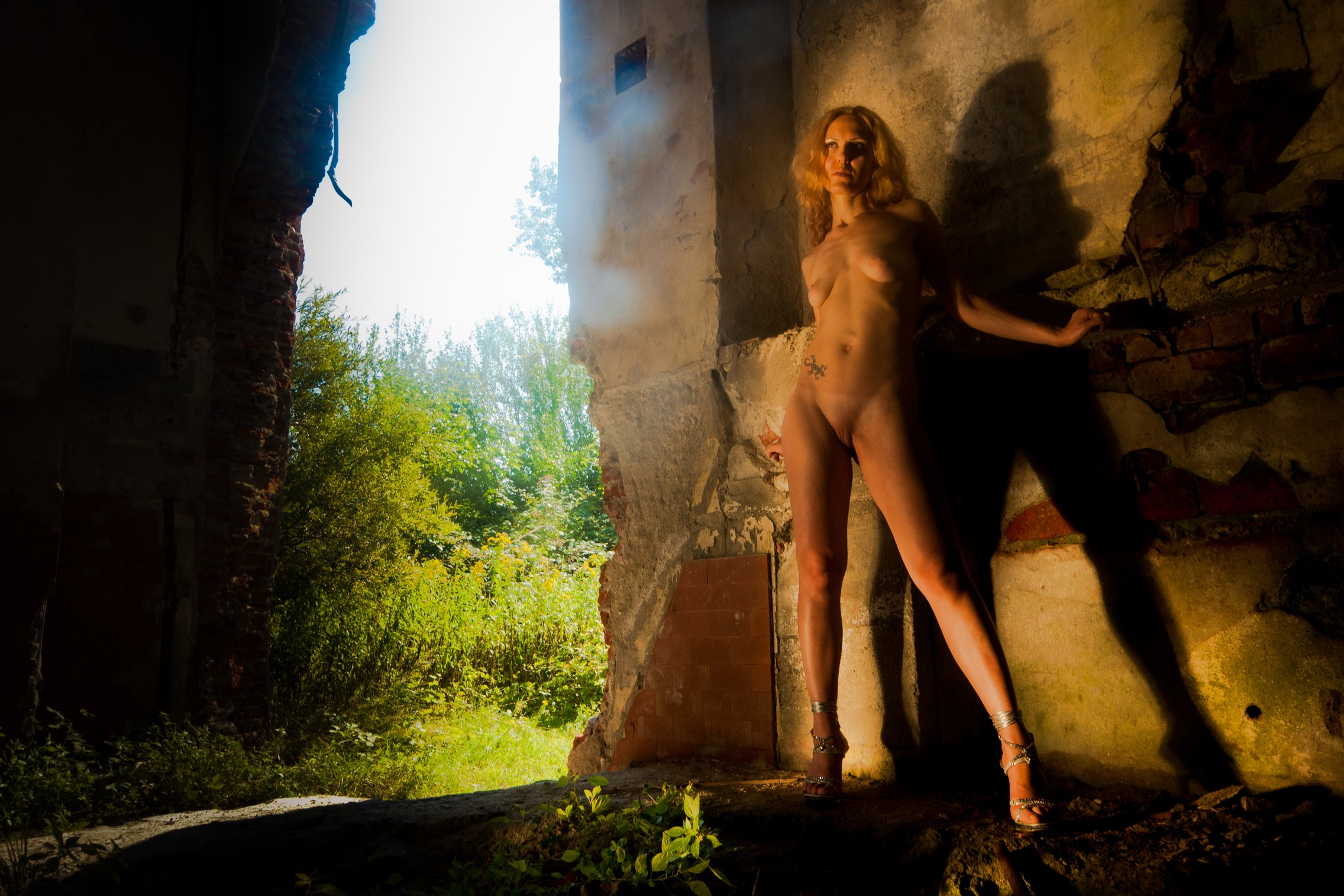
Shadow on the wall, 2010
