= Grayer =

Grayer is a surname. Notable people with the surname include:

- Jeff Grayer (born 1965), American basketball player
- Jonathan Grayer (born 1964), American businessperson

== See also ==
- Drayer
- Graver (surname)
