= Hospital General de la Plaza de la Salud =

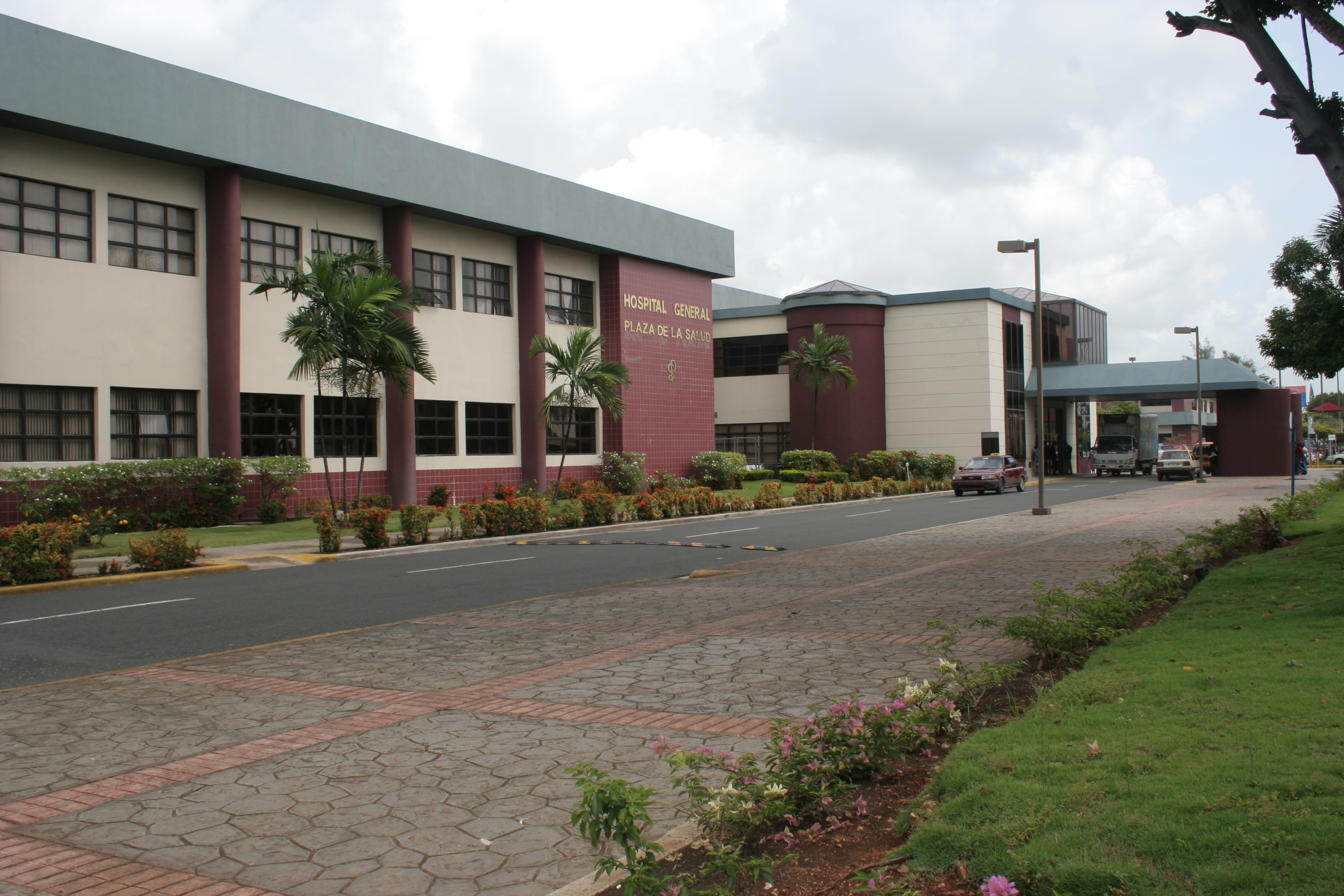
- Hospital General de la Plaza de la Salud

Geography
- Location: Avenida Ortega y Gasset Ensanche La Fe, Santo Domingo, Distrito Nacional, the Dominican Republic
- Coordinates: 18.489055°N 69.921915°W

Organisation
- Type: General

History
- Opened: 1996

Links
- Lists: Hospitals in the Dominican Republic

Hospital General de la Plaza de la Salud (HGPS) is a non-profit entity with self-management in the selection and recruitment of staff and in the formulation and use of its budget. It is located on Avenida Ortega y Gasset Ensanche La Fe, Santo Domingo, Distrito Nacional of the Dominican Republic.

The HGPS is technically and administratively managed by a board set up by Decree No. 131, April 18, 1996 and ratified by Congress through Law No.78-99, dated 24 July 1999. The Board is composed of distinguished doctors, businessmen, and individuals dedicated to serving the Dominican community as well as ex officio members: the Secretary of State for Public Health and Social Welfare, the Director of the Dominican Social Security Institute, the Chairman of National Council of Businessmen and the Secretary of Labor.

Under the supervision of the Board, the HGPS has an organizational structure headed by the Executive Directorate, responsible for coordinating the planning and management to achieve its goals. Dependent on this Directorate are the Financial Management and Administration Directorate, Medical Directorate and the Directorate of Hospital Support. These in turn have different departments headed by managers and service units under the supervision of their heads.

HGPS medical staff is composed of specialists, sub-specialists and general or internal practitioners, grouped into the following departments: Internal medicine and specialties, General Surgery and specialties, OB-GYN, Gastroenterology and Endoscopy, Pediatrics and specialties, Family Medicine Education and Research, Orthopedics and Traumatology. Other services offered are: Diagnostic Imaging, Pathology, Geriatrics, Physical medicine and rehabilitation, Dentistry, Laboratory and Blood Bank, Cardiology, Onco Hematology, Ophthalmology, Breast Pathology, Emergency Medicine, nursing, pharmacy, nutrition and social work.

Each year, the HGPS benefits more than 13,000 low-income patients who receive up to a 40 percent discount or are exempt from payment according to their financial condition. The HGPS receives a grant from the Dominican Government that covers the annual cost of exemptions and discounts to patients with limited resources.

Since 2003, the HGPS is a teaching facility and has three medical residency programs in the areas of Family and Community Medicine, Medical Emergency and Disasters and Rehabilitation Medicine, supported by the Universidad Iberoamericana (UNIBE). At present, the HGPS has become a major center for training and education for the health sciences faculties of major universities in the country: UNIBE, INTEC, UNPHU, UCE, UASD, and the Catholic University Santo Domingo (UCSD), for both its undergraduate and graduate programs.

The HGPS is recognized as a center of excellence in Dominican medicine, setting quality standards for the entire country.

== History ==
The medical institutions of the Plaza de la Salud: the General Hospital (HGPS) and the Centers for Diagnostics and Advanced Medicine and Medical Conferences and Telemedicine (CEDIMAT), part of the concept created by Dr. Juan Manuel Taveras Rodriguez, a world-renowned Dominican medical specialist, considered the father of Neuroradiology. In 1996, President Joaquín Balaguer, by decree designated an area of 221,030.62 square feet (20,534.417 m^{2}) for these buildings. The area is divided into equal parts between HGPS and CEDIMAT and shares its grounds with other health institutions such as the Pan American Health Organization (PAHO / WHO), the Emergency Operations Center (COE) and the Presidential Commission for AIDS (COPRESIDA) among others. The initial construction was built with funds by the Dominican State.

Law 163-03, dated February 10, 2003, approved the grant contract between the Dominican State and the Boards of both HGPS and CEDIMAT for the assignment and transfer of land of the Plaza de la Salud. The law was promulgated by the Executive Power, dated 13 September 2003.

== HGPS Highlights ==
- It has helped more than 140,000 low-income patients with discounts and waivers of its health treatment plans, helping to improve their quality of life and their physical and emotional well-being.
- Blood Bank with a high level of reliability and credibility, as well as the creation of the section of Cryopreservation of stem cells at the Blood Bank, which supports the HGPS's bone marrow transplant services (only one in the country).
- It is a teaching hospital facility with a board of educational programs in the following specialties: Family and Community Medicine, Medical Emergency and Disasters and Rehabilitation Medicine.
- Conducts a yearly Scientific Symposium to present the institution's research and medical advances.
- CENTOX, the first Poison control center in the Dominican Republic.
- Followed the successful pregnancy, delivery and birth of the first sextuplets in the Dominican Republic with only 26 and a half weeks of gestation. The children are now 4 years of age and healthy (2009).
- Pediatric intensive care unit (PICU) as a national reference of care.
- Pacemaker Clinic
- Hemodialysis Unit
- Center for Integrated medicine
- Thorax Pain Unit
- Organ and tissue transplantation program., which has a Transplant Counsel and an Organ Captivity Coordination Unit. The program achieved the first kidney transplant from a deceased donor in the country, liver transplants from deceased donors and corneal transplantation.
- Physical Medicine and Rehabilitation Hospital, with Urodynamics and Isokinetic Diagnostics units.
- Volunteerism unit to work with the hospital community with a high degree of solidarity and commitment.
- First Primary Care Center of the Dominican Republic.
- The country's first outpatient surgery program.
- The permanence of the only functioning hospital bioethics committee in the country, meeting regularly since 1997.
- Implementation of the first free hip and knee replacement program in the country called Operation Walk, a medical mission for patients with limited resources. It was led by a team of local and international specialists from Brigham and Women's Hospital and since 2008, has benefited over 80 Dominican patients and their families.
- Units of Care and Solidarity (UNASOL), offering medical assistance to thousands of people affected by tragedies of force majeure.
- Diabetic foot Clinic to prevent and treat all foot diseases in any patient.
- Dengue Clinic, as a national reference for all those who present symptoms.

== Criticism ==
Since its inception, the HGPS has been perceived by the Dominican people as being a State-run facility that should offer free services as it was initially built using State funds. However, by decree, the HGPS was created to provide non-profit medical assistance and uses the fees for services to continue to run its day-to-day operations. While the HGPS receives a government grant to cover services offered to low-income patients at discount or free of charge, the cost of operations can only be met charging a below market fee for its renown medical services.

== See also ==
- Health in the Dominican Republic
