= Juan Manuel Taveras =

Dominican physician, founder of neuroradiology (1919–2002)

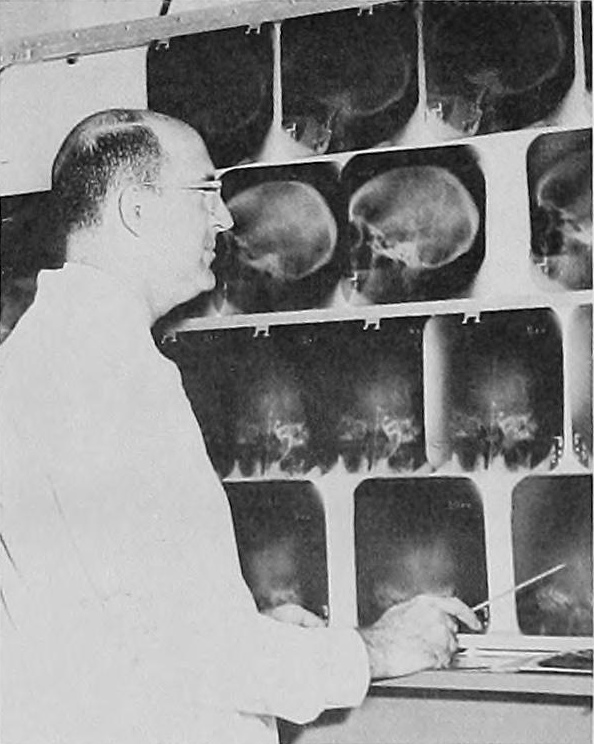
Juan M. Taveras c. 1960

Juan Manuel Taveras Rodríguez (September 27, 1919, Moca, Dominican Republic—March 28, 2002, Santo Domingo, Dominican Republic) was a Dominican physician and scientist. He was Professor Emeritus at Harvard Medical School and Washington University School of Medicine and Director of the Mallinckrodt Institute of Radiology at Washington University in St. Louis. His past roles included was the a Radiologist-in-Chief Emeritus of the Massachusetts General Hospital and former Chair of Radiology at Washington University School of Medicine.

He is widely regarded as the father of the medical specialty of neuroradiology, having co-authored the first textbook of this specialty and founded both the American Society of Neuroradiology and its journal, of which he served for several years as president and editor, respectively.

== Career ==
Taveras made important innovations in training, investigation, radiologic administration, and professional organization which had global impact on the broader spectrum of radiology and the neurosciences throughout the world. Additionally, he was the main force behind the development of the Hospital General de la Plaza de la Salud in Santo Domingo, as well as its Centro de Diagnóstico, Medicina Avanzada, Laboratorio y Telemedicina, a state-of-the-art medical clinic for diagnosis and treatment, which has become one of the major centers for medical education in Latin America .

He received medical doctorates from both the Universidad Autónoma de Santo Domingo in 1943 and from the University of Pennsylvania in 1949, and completed a radiology residency under the direction of Dr. Arthur Finkelstein at the Graduate Hospital of the University of Pennsylvania.
