= Max Wintermark =

Swiss and American neuroradiologist

- Scientific career
- Fields: Neuroradiology
- Institutions: University of Texas MD Anderson; Stanford University; University of Virginia; UCSF; University of Lausanne, Switzerland

Max Wintermark is a Swiss and American neuroradiologist (brain-imaging expert) who pioneered perfusion scanning of the brain. Wintermark is currently a Professor and the Chair of Neuroradiology at the University of Texas MD Anderson Center in Houston, Texas. Previously, he worked at Stanford and the University of Virginia in Charlottesville, VA. He trained in Lausanne, Switzerland and at the University of California, San Francisco (UCSF). Wintermark is editor-in-chief of the American Journal of Neuroradiology and past president chair of the American Society of Neuroradiology.

== See also ==
- Perfusion scanning
