= Welgemoed =

Welgemoed is a surname. Notable people with the surname include:

- Piet Welgemoed, South African politician
- Shaun Morgan (born 1978), South African musician; full name Shaun Morgan Welgemoed
- Willem Welgemoed (1925–1992), South African diver

== See also ==
- Wohlgemuth, surname
- Welgemoed, Bellville, a suburb
