= Walter A. Wohlgemuth =

German radiologist

- Born: 15 May 1966 (age 60); Bad Kreuznach, Germany
- Known for: Congenital vascular anomalies and pediatric interventional radiology.
- Scientific career
- Fields: Radiology, Neuroradiology
- Workplaces: Martin Luther University Halle-Wittenberg

Walter A. Wohlgemuth (born 15 May 1966 in Bad Kreuznach) is a German radiologist and neuroradiologist and Director of the University Clinic and Policlinic of Radiology at the Martin Luther University Halle-Wittenberg.

== Biography ==
Wohlgemuth studied medicine at the University of Regensburg, at the Technical University of Munich and at LMU Munich as well as health economics at the University of Bayreuth. After finishing his dissertation he began his career at the Clinic of Radiology and Neuroradiology and at the Clinic of Neurology and Clinical Neurophysiology at Augsburg Hospital. In 2001, he was named functional attending chief resident and 2003 attending deputy and head of the department of vascular and interventional radiology. Since 2002, Wohlgemuth worked as a scientific assistant at the Institute for Medical Management and Health Sciences at the University of Bayreuth. In 2005, he was habilitated at the faculty for law and economics at the University of Bayreuth and received a venia legendi for medical management and health management. From 2007 to 2011, he was the avocational CEO of the GWS Gesundheit Wissenschaft Strategie GmbH, a research and consulting company in the field of health management. In 2009, Wohlgemuth launched the Interdisciplinary Center for Congenital Vascular Anomalies at Augsburg Hospital, which he presided until 2011. In 2011, he was appointed professor of interventional radiology and attending deputy at the Department of Radiology at the University Medical Center Regensburg. From 2012 to 2017, Wohlgemuth was head of the newly established Interdisciplinary Vascular Anomalies Center in Regensburg. In 2015, Wohlgemuth founded the first German Center for pediatric interventional radiology, an interdisciplinary treatment unit with minimal-invasive operation methods for children. In June 2017, he was appointed Ordinarius and Director of the University Clinic and Policlinic of Radiology at the Martin Luther University Halle-Wittenberg. Since 2018, he is Head of the Interdisciplinary Center of Vascular Anomalies at Universitätsklinikum Halle (Saale).

== Academic memberships ==
Wohlgemuth was the official deputy of Eckhard Nagel in the commission for sustainability in the financing of the social security systems (Kommission für die Nachhaltigkeit in der Finanzierung der sozialen Sicherungssysteme), which was established by the German government in 2002/03 under the name of Rürup-Kommission. From 2005 to 2017 he was a member of the expert committee medical and health sciences at AQUIN, a leading German institute for accreditation, certification and quality management in the area of certification of higher education. He is also a member of the scientific advisory board of the support group for congenital vascular diseases as well as the deputy speaker of the committee for vascular diseases in childhood of the German Association for Angiology (Deutsche Gesellschaft für Angiologie). Currently, Wohlgemuth is an employee of the review board of the journals European Radiology, Health Policy und Cardio Vascular and Interventional Radiology. Since 2017 he is President of the German Interdisciplinary Society of Vascular Anomalies (GISVA) and editor and author of the Compendium Vascular Anomalies, a free web-based portal with scientific expert knowledge regarding diagnosis and therapy of vascular anomalies.

== Publications ==
Books

- Zorger Niels, Müller-Wille René, Wohlgemuth Walter A.: Embolisationstherapie – Grundlagen und praktische Anwendung. Unimed-Verlag, Bremen, London, Boston, 2013.
- Wohlgemuth Walter A., Freitag Michael H. Priorisierung in der Medizin – Interdisziplinäre Forschungsansätze. Medizinisch Wissenschaftliche Verlagsgesellschaft MWV, Berlin, 2009.
- Wohlgemuth Walter A.: Evidenzbasierte Einflussfaktoren und gesundheitsbezogene Lebensqualität. Eine gesundheitswissenschaftliche Analyse anhand der peripheren arteriellen Verschlusskrankheit. Bayreuther Schriftenreihe Gesundheitsökonomie, Universität Bayreuth, Bayreuth, 2005.
- Wohlgemuth Walter A., Mayer Julika, Nagel Eckhard: Handbuch zu einer strategischen Gesundheitsstrukturreform in Deutschland. Bayreuther Gesundheitsökonomie Bd.4, Verlag PCO, Bayreuth, 2003.

Book-articles

- Walter A. Wohlgemuth, René Müller-Wille: Direkte Lymphographie mit Intranodaler Lymphangiographie und Lymphgefäßinterventionen. In: Wolfgang Brauer (Hrsg.): Bildgebung Lymphologie. Sonographie, Lymphangiographie, MR und Nuklearmedizin. Springer Verlag, Berlin, 2021, S.167-174
- René Müller-Wille, Walter A. Wohlgemuth: Zystische Lymphatische Malformation (LM) – Diagnose und Therapie. In: Wolfgang Brauer (Hrsg.): Bildgebung Lymphologie. Sonographie, Lymphangiographie, MR und Nuklearmedizin. Springer Verlag, Berlin, 2021, S.175-184
- Wohlgemuth Walter A.: Vaskuläre Malformationen im Knochen. In: Bohndorf Klaus, Imhof Herwig, Wörtler Klaus (Hrsg.): Radiologische Diagnostik der Knochen und Gelenke. Georg Thieme Verlag, Stuttgart, New York, 2013, S.320-324.
- Volk J., Wohlgemuth Walter A.: Integrierte Versorgung. In: Nagel Eckhard (Hrsg.): Das Gesundheitswesen in Deutschland. Deutscher Ärzteverlag, Köln, 2012. S.279-287.
- Osborne Anne G., Blaser Susan I., Salzman Karen L.: Pocket Radiologist Gehirn: Die Top 100 Diagnosen. Elsevier Company, München, 2004 [Translation to German].
- Wohlgemuth Walter A.: Intensivmedizinisch relevante Bildgebung des Thorax. In: Eckart Joachim, Forst Helmut, Burchardi Hans: Intensivmedizin. EcoMed Verlag, Landsberg/Lech, 2003. S.7-35.
- Bohndorf Klaus, Wohlgemuth Walter A.: Radiologische Diagnostik. In: Zimmermann Walter, Amarotico Erich, Koch Hans H.: Kompaktwissen Innere Medizin. Dustri-Verlag, München, 1999. S.1-34.
- Engelhardt Michael, Willy Christian, Wohlgemuth Walter A., Wölfle Klaus-Dieter: Wie empfindet der Patient die „Vorteile“ der peripheren Bypass-Chirurgie? In: Luther Bernd, Hepp Wolfgang (Hrsg.): Kruropedale Arterienverschlüsse – Diagnostiken und Behandlungsverfahren. Steinkopff Verlag, Heidelberg, 2009. S.173-180.
- Freitag Michael H., Wohlgemuth Walter A., Nagel Eckhard: Perspektiven der Versorgungsforschung aus wissenschaftstheoretischer Sicht. In: Blettner Maria, Fuchs Christoph, Michaelis Jörg, Nagel Eckhard (Hrsg.): Versorgungsforschung als Instrument zur Gesundheitssystementwicklung. Akademie der Wissenschaften und der Literatur, Medizinische Forschung (Band 15), Mainz, 2009. S.55-60.
