= Perfusion scanning =

- Purpose: process by which perfusion can be observed

Perfusion is the passage of fluid through the lymphatic system or blood vessels to an organ or a tissue. The practice of perfusion scanning is the process by which this perfusion can be observed, recorded and quantified. The term perfusion scanning encompasses a wide range of medical imaging modalities.

== Applications ==
With the ability to ascertain data on the blood flow to vital organs such as the heart and the brain, doctors are able to make quicker and more accurate choices on treatment for patients. Nuclear medicine has been leading perfusion scanning for some time, although the modality has certain pitfalls. It is often dubbed 'unclear medicine' as the scans produced may appear to the untrained eye as just fluffy and irregular patterns. More recent developments in CT and MRI have meant clearer images and solid data, such as graphs depicting blood flow, and blood volume charted over a fixed period of time.

== Microsphere perfusion ==
Using radioactive microspheres is an older method of measuring perfusion than the more recent imaging techniques. This process involves labeling microspheres with radioactive isotopes and injecting these into the test subject. Perfusion measurements are taken by comparing the radioactivity of selected regions within the body to radioactivity of blood samples withdrawn at the time of microsphere injection.

Later, techniques were developed to substitute radioactively labeled microspheres for fluorescent microspheres.

== CT perfusion ==
The method by which perfusion to an organ measured by CT is still a relatively new concept, although the first dynamic imaging studies of cerebral perfusion were reported on in 1979 by E. Ralph Heinz et al. from the Duke University Medical Center, Durham, North Carolina, itself citing a reference on a presentation on "Dynamic Computed Tomography" at the XI. Symposium Neuroradiologicum in Wiesbaden, June 4–10, 1978, which has not been submitted to the conference proceedings. The original framework and principles for CT perfusion analysis were concretely laid out in 1980 by Leon Axel at University of California San Francisco. It is most commonly carried out for neuroimaging using dynamic sequential scanning of a pre-selected region of the brain during the injection of a bolus of iodinated contrast material as it travels through the vasculature. Various mathematical models can then be used to process the raw temporal data to ascertain quantitative information such as rate of cerebral blood flow (CBF) following an ischemic stroke or aneurysmal subarachnoid hemorrhage. Practical CT perfusion as performed on modern CT scanners was first described by Ken Miles, Mike Hayball and Adrian Dixon from Cambridge UK and subsequently developed by many individuals including Matthias Koenig and Ernst Klotz in Germany, and later by Max Wintermark in Switzerland and Ting-Yim Lee in Ontario, Canada.

== MRI perfusion ==
There are different techniques of Perfusion MRI, the most common being dynamic contrast-enhanced (DCE), dynamic susceptibility contrast imaging (DSC), and arterial spin labelling (ASL).

In DSC, Gadolinium contrast agent (Gd) is injected (usually intravenously) and a time series of fast T2*-weighted images is acquired. As Gadolinium passes through the tissues, it induces a reduction of T2* in the nearby water protons; the corresponding decrease in signal intensity observed depends on the local Gd concentration, which may be considered a proxy for perfusion. The acquired time series data are then postprocessed to obtain perfusion maps with different parameters, such as BV (blood volume), BF (blood flow), MTT (mean transit time) and TTP (time to peak).

DCE-MRI also uses intravenous Gd contrast, but the time series is T1-weighted and gives increased signal intensity corresponding to local Gd concentration. Modelling of DCE-MRI yields parameters related to vascular permeability and extravasation transfer rate (see main article on perfusion MRI).

Arterial spin labelling (ASL) has the advantage of not relying on an injected contrast agent, instead inferring perfusion from a drop in signal observed in the imaging slice arising from inflowing spins (outside the imaging slice) having been selectively saturated. A number of ASL schemes are possible, the simplest being flow alternating inversion recovery (FAIR) which requires two acquisitions of identical parameters with the exception of the out-of-slice saturation; the difference in the two images is theoretically only from inflowing spins, and may be considered a 'perfusion map'.

== NM perfusion ==
Nuclear medicine uses radioactive isotopes for the diagnosis and treatment of patients. Whereas radiology provides data mostly on structure, nuclear medicine provides complementary information about function. All nuclear medicine scans give information to the referrering clinician on the function of the system they are imaging.

Specific techniques used are generally either of the following:

- Single-photon emission computed tomography (SPECT), which creates 3-dimensional images of the target organ or organ system.
- Scintigraphy, creating 2-dimensional images.

Uses of NM perfusion scanning include Ventilation/perfusion scans of lungs, myocardial perfusion imaging of the heart, and functional brain imaging.

=== Ventilation/perfusion scans ===
Ventilation/perfusion scans, sometimes called a VQ (V=Ventilation, Q=perfusion) scan, is a way of identifying mismatched areas of blood and air supply to the lungs. It is primarily used to detect a pulmonary embolus.

The perfusion part of the study uses a radioisotope tagged to the blood which shows where in the lungs the blood is perfusing. If the scan shows up any area missing a supply on the scans this means there is a blockage which is not allowing the blood to perfuse that part of the organ.

=== Myocardial perfusion imaging ===
Myocardial perfusion imaging (MPI) is a form of functional cardiac imaging, used for the diagnosis of ischemic heart disease. The underlying principle is that under conditions of stress, diseased myocardium receives less blood flow than normal myocardium. MPI is one of several types of cardiac stress test.

A cardiac specific radiopharmaceutical is administered. E.g. ^{99m}Tc-tetrofosmin (Myoview, GE healthcare), ^{99m}Tc-sestamibi (Cardiolite, Bristol-Myers Squibb now Lantheus Medical Imaging). Following this, the heart rate is raised to induce myocardial stress, either by exercise or pharmacologically with adenosine, dobutamine or dipyridamole (aminophylline can be used to reverse the effects of dipyridamole).

SPECT imaging performed after stress reveals the distribution of the radiopharmaceutical, and therefore the relative blood flow to the different regions of the myocardium. Diagnosis is made by comparing stress images to a further set of images obtained at rest. As the radionuclide redistributes slowly, it is not usually possible to perform both sets of images on the same day, hence a second attendance is required 1–7 days later (although, with a Tl-201 myocardial perfusion study with dipyridamole, rest images can be acquired as little as two-hours post stress). However, if stress imaging is normal, it is unnecessary to perform rest imaging, as it too will be normal – thus stress imaging is normally performed first.

MPI has been demonstrated to have an overall accuracy of about 83% (sensitivity: 85%; specificity: 72%), and is comparable (or better) than other non-invasive tests for ischemic heart disease, including stress echocardiography.

=== Functional brain imaging ===
Usually the gamma-emitting tracer used in functional brain imaging is technetium (^{99m}Tc) exametazime (^{99m}Tc-HMPAO, hexamethylpropylene amine oxime). Technetium-99m (^{99m}Tc) is a metastable nuclear isomer which emits gamma rays which can be detected by a gamma camera. When it is attached to exametazime, this allows ^{99m}Tc to be taken up by brain tissue in a manner proportional to brain blood flow, in turn allowing brain blood flow to be assessed with the nuclear gamma camera.

Because blood flow in the brain is tightly coupled to local brain metabolism and energy use, ^{99m}Tc-exametazime (as well as the similar ^{99m}Tc-EC tracer) is used to assess brain metabolism regionally, in an attempt to diagnose and differentiate the different causal pathologies of dementia. Meta analysis of many reported studies suggests that SPECT with this tracer is about 74% sensitive at diagnosing Alzheimer's disease, vs. 81% sensitivity for clinical exam (mental testing, etc.). More recent studies have shown accuracy of SPECT in Alzheimer diagnosis as high as 88%. In meta analysis, SPECT was superior to clinical exam and clinical criteria (91% vs. 70%) in being able to differentiate Alzheimer's disease from vascular dementias. This latter ability relates to SPECT's imaging of local metabolism of the brain, in which the patchy loss of cortical metabolism seen in multiple strokes differs clearly from the more even or "smooth" loss of non-occipital cortical brain function typical of Alzheimer's disease.

^{99m}Tc-exametazime SPECT scanning competes with fludeoxyglucose (FDG) PET scanning of the brain, which works to assess regional brain glucose metabolism, to provide very similar information about local brain damage from many processes. SPECT is more widely available, however, for the basic reason that the radioisotope generation technology is longer-lasting and far less expensive in SPECT, and the gamma scanning equipment is less expensive as well. The reason for this is that ^{99m}Tc is extracted from relatively simple technetium-99m generators which are delivered to hospitals and scanning centers weekly, to supply fresh radioisotope, whereas FDG PET relies on FDG which must be made in an expensive medical cyclotron and "hot-lab" (automated chemistry lab for radiopharmaceutical manufacture), then must be delivered directly to scanning sites, with delivery-fraction for each trip limited by its natural short 110 minute half-life.

=== Testicular torsion detection ===
Radionuclide scanning of the scrotum is the most accurate imaging technique to diagnose testicular torsion, but it is not routinely available. The agent of choice for this purpose is technetium-99m pertechnetate. Initially it provides a radionuclide angiogram, followed by a static image after the radionuclide has perfused the tissue. In the healthy patient, initial images show symmetric flow to the testes, and delayed images show uniformly symmetric activity.

== See also ==
- Functional magnetic resonance imaging
- Ischemia-reperfusion injury of the appendicular musculoskeletal system
- MUGA scan
- Perfusion
- Positron emission tomography
- Stroke
- Ventilation/perfusion ratio
