= HGP =

HGP may refer to:

- Haryana Gana Parishad, a political party in India
- Holy Ghost Preparatory School, in Bensalem, Pennsylvania, United States
- Human Genome Project
- Progeria (Hutchinson–Gilford progeria)
- Homegrown Player in Major League Soccer; see Homegrown Player Rule (Major League Soccer)
