= Wohlmuth =

Wohlmuth is a German surname. Notable people with the surname include:

- Barbara Wohlmuth (born 1967), German mathematician
- Robert Wohlmuth (1902–1987), Austrian film director and screenwriter
- Sharon Wohlmuth (1946–2022), American photojournalist
