= Wolgamot =

Wolgamot is a surname. Notable people with the surname include:

- Earl Wolgamot (1892–1970), American baseball player and manager
- John Barton Wolgamot (1902–1989), American poet
