= American Journal of Neuroradiology =

- Discipline: Neuroradiology
- Language: English
- Edited by: Jeffrey S. Ross

Publication details
- History: 1980–present
- Publisher: American Society of Neuroradiology (United States)
- Frequency: Monthly
- Impact factor: 3.653 (2017)

Standard abbreviations
- ISO 4: Am. J. Neuroradiol.

Indexing
- ISSN: 0195-6108 (print); 1936-959X (web)
- OCLC no.: 802697526

Links
- Journal homepage; Online access; Online archive

The American Journal of Neuroradiology is a monthly peer-reviewed medical journal covering neuroradiology. It was established in 1980 and is published by the American Society of Neuroradiology. The editor-in-chief is Max Wintermark (MD Anderson Cancer Center, Houston, Texas).

== Abstracting and indexing ==
The journal is abstracted and indexed in:

- BIOSIS Previews
- Current Contents/Clinical Medicine
- Current Contents/Life Sciences
- Embase
- Index Medicus/MEDLINE/PubMed
- Science Citation Index
- Scopus

According to the Journal Citation Reports, the journal has a 2017 impact factor of 3.653.
