= Neuroradiology =

Medical specialty

Neuroradiology is a subspecialty of radiology focusing on the diagnosis and characterization of abnormalities of the central and peripheral nervous system, spine, and head and neck using neuroimaging techniques. Medical issues utilizing neuroradiology include arteriovenous malformations, tumors, aneurysms, and strokes.

== History ==
Neuroradiology began in the early 1900s soon after Wilhelm Röntgen discovered X-rays, with the use of skull radiographs to evaluate brain tumours.

The first full-time neuroradiologist in the US was Cornelius Gysbert Dyke, MD (1900–1943) at the New York Neurological Institute in 1930.

== Professional organizations ==
The major professional association in the United States representing neuroradiologists is th American Society of Neuroradiology (ASNR). The ASNR publishes the American Journal of Neuroradiology (AJNR). The ASNR annual meeting rotates through different cities, and usually takes place between late April and early June. The specialty neuroradiology societies that are associated with the ASNR include the American Society of Pediatric Neuroradiology (ASPNR), the American Society of Spine Radiology (ASSR), the American Society of Head and Neck Radiology (ASHNR), and the American Society of Functional Neuroradiology (ASFNR). These societies contribute to the programming of the ASNR annual meeting and also hold their own annual meetings.

The major professional association in Europe is the European Society of Neuroradiology (ESNR). In Japan, it is the Japanese Neuroradiological Society; in the UK, it is the British Society of Neuroradiologists (BSNR); and in France, it is the French Society of Neuroradiology (SFNR). The ESNR and the Japanese society publish Neuroradiology, and the SFNR publishes the Journal of Neuroradiology.

== See also ==
- Radiology
- Neurology
- Neuroimaging
- Neurosurgery
- Interventional neuroradiology
- Juan Manuel Taveras
