= Euphoresia ugandana =

Scientific classification
- Kingdom: Animalia
- Phylum: Arthropoda
- Clade: Pancrustacea
- Class: Insecta
- Order: Coleoptera
- Suborder: Polyphaga
- Infraorder: Scarabaeiformia
- Family: Scarabaeidae
- Genus: Euphoresia
- Species: E. ugandana

Binomial name
- Euphoresia ugandana Kolbe, 1913

Species of beetle

Euphoresia ugandana is a species of beetle of the family Scarabaeidae. It is found in Uganda.

== Description ==
Adults reach a length of about 7–7.5 mm (0.28–0.30 in). They are small and brown, checkered blackish and whitish, with a large median spot or stripe on the pygidium. They are similar to Euphoresia multipunctata, but the posterior margin of the femora of the third pair of legs does not appear as a sharp tooth in multipunctata. Furthermore, the interstriae of the elytra do not appear as black ribs in multipunctata.
