= Euphoresia gabonensis =

Scientific classification
- Kingdom: Animalia
- Phylum: Arthropoda
- Class: Insecta
- Order: Coleoptera
- Suborder: Polyphaga
- Infraorder: Scarabaeiformia
- Family: Scarabaeidae
- Genus: Euphoresia
- Species: E. gabonensis

Binomial name
- Euphoresia gabonensis Brenske, 1901

Species of beetle

Euphoresia gabonensis is a species of beetle of the family Scarabaeidae. It is found in Gabon.

== Description ==
Adults reach a length of about 8.5–9 mm. They are nearly identical to Euphoresia bruta, but smaller and the antennae of the males are shorter. The clypeus is densely wrinkled and punctate, covered with strong scales at the base (while bruta has no scales), and the frons also has individual scales. The pronotum is more densely scaled on the sides, and the elytral scales are finer.
