= Sphaerotrochalus simillimus =

Scientific classification
- Kingdom: Animalia
- Phylum: Arthropoda
- Clade: Pancrustacea
- Class: Insecta
- Order: Coleoptera
- Suborder: Polyphaga
- Infraorder: Scarabaeiformia
- Family: Scarabaeidae
- Genus: Sphaerotrochalus
- Species: S. simillimus

Binomial name
- Sphaerotrochalus simillimus Moser, 1919

Species of beetle

Sphaerotrochalus simillimus is a species of beetle of the family Scarabaeidae. It is found in Tanzania.

== Description ==
Adults reach a length of about 6–7 mm. They are very similar to Sphaerotrochalus boehmi, with the same shape and colouration. However, the frons is more strongly sculpted, and the punctures on the pronotum are also stronger. The posterior angles of the pronotum are slightly more rounded, and viewed from above, the pronotum appears less tapered posteriorly. The spaces between the rows of punctures on the elytra are more convex than in boehmi, and the hind legs are not quite as broad.
