= Neoserica fulvicolor =

Scientific classification
- Kingdom: Animalia
- Phylum: Arthropoda
- Class: Insecta
- Order: Coleoptera
- Suborder: Polyphaga
- Infraorder: Scarabaeiformia
- Family: Scarabaeidae
- Genus: Neoserica
- Species: N. fulvicolor

Binomial name
- Neoserica fulvicolor (Quedenfeldt, 1884)

Synonyms
- Serica fulvicolor Quedenfeldt, 1884; Autoserica fulvicolor

Species of beetle

Neoserica fulvicolor is a species of beetle of the family Scarabaeidae. It is found in Angola.

== Description ==
Adults reach a length of about 7.5 mm. They have a somewhat elongate-oval body. The upper and lower surfaces are dull reddish-yellow with a faint silky sheen. The elytra have fine striae of punctures, with the intervals somewhat coarsely and finely punctured, each puncture with a very small, barely visible, white setae. The underside is slightly lighter than the upperside.
