= Euphoresia bisignata =

Scientific classification
- Kingdom: Animalia
- Phylum: Arthropoda
- Clade: Pancrustacea
- Class: Insecta
- Order: Coleoptera
- Suborder: Polyphaga
- Infraorder: Scarabaeiformia
- Family: Scarabaeidae
- Genus: Euphoresia
- Species: E. bisignata

Binomial name
- Euphoresia bisignata Moser, 1913

Species of beetle

Euphoresia bisignata is a species of beetle of the family Scarabaeidae. It is found in Uganda.

== Description ==
Adults reach a length of about 10 mm. They are similar to Euphoresia punctum, but the small scales on the pronotum and elytra are elliptical (while they are lanceolate, almost bristle-like in bisignata). The scales on the scutellum are approximately the same size as the scattered larger ones on the pronotum. The elytra are striated, the intervals only very weakly convex. The fine scales are moderately dense everywhere, but not uniformly spaced.
