= Euphoresia maculifera =

Scientific classification
- Kingdom: Animalia
- Phylum: Arthropoda
- Class: Insecta
- Order: Coleoptera
- Suborder: Polyphaga
- Infraorder: Scarabaeiformia
- Family: Scarabaeidae
- Genus: Euphoresia
- Species: E. maculifera

Binomial name
- Euphoresia maculifera Brenske, 1901

Species of beetle

Euphoresia maculifera is a species of beetle of the family Scarabaeidae. It is found in Gabon and the Democratic Republic of the Congo.

== Description ==
Adults reach a length of about 7 mm. They are very similar to Euphoresia chiloanga, but somewhat larger and more heavily scaled. On the pronotum, the sides are densely scaled, the middle is scale-free with a narrow dark longitudinal line and two larger spots. The second rib on the elytra is covered with three dark spots, while the fourth rib is usually less dense and of smaller extent.
