= Euphoresia pygialis =

Scientific classification
- Kingdom: Animalia
- Phylum: Arthropoda
- Class: Insecta
- Order: Coleoptera
- Suborder: Polyphaga
- Infraorder: Scarabaeiformia
- Family: Scarabaeidae
- Genus: Euphoresia
- Species: E. pygialis

Binomial name
- Euphoresia pygialis Brenske, 1900

Species of beetle

Euphoresia pygialis is a species of beetle of the family Scarabaeidae. It is found in Gabon, the Democratic Republic of the Congo and Togo.

== Description ==
Adults reach a length of about 10.5–11.5 mm. They are very similar to Euphoresia buttneri, but the clypeus is somewhat more densely wrinkled. The pronotum is widened laterally in an almost straight line posteriorly, without being curved and the scales here and on the elytra are finer and more hair-like. On the elytra, the bare patches almost disappear. The scales of the entire underside are smaller.
