= Euphoresia viridicans =

Scientific classification
- Kingdom: Animalia
- Phylum: Arthropoda
- Class: Insecta
- Order: Coleoptera
- Suborder: Polyphaga
- Infraorder: Scarabaeiformia
- Family: Scarabaeidae
- Genus: Euphoresia
- Species: E. viridicans

Binomial name
- Euphoresia viridicans Brenske, 1901

Species of beetle

Euphoresia viridicans is a species of beetle of the family Scarabaeidae. It is found in the Democratic Republic of the Congo.

== Description ==
Adults reach a length of about 9 mm. They are very similar to Euphoresia ludificans, but slightly smaller, relatively wider and entirely green. The scales on the frons are stronger. On the pronotum, they are much denser laterally, so that they merge and form a white patch of scales. The scutellum has a broadly rounded tip and is scaled only at the anterior corners. On the elytra, the sutures of the 1st, 3rd, 5th, and 7th costa are narrower than in E. ludificans and much narrower than the 2nd, 4th, and 5th costa.
