= Euphoresia heteropyga =

Scientific classification
- Kingdom: Animalia
- Phylum: Arthropoda
- Clade: Pancrustacea
- Class: Insecta
- Order: Coleoptera
- Suborder: Polyphaga
- Infraorder: Scarabaeiformia
- Family: Scarabaeidae
- Genus: Euphoresia
- Species: E. heteropyga

Binomial name
- Euphoresia heteropyga Moser, 1913

Species of beetle

Euphoresia heteropyga is a species of beetle of the family Scarabaeidae. It is found in the Republic of the Congo.

== Description ==
Adults reach a length of about 6 mm. They are similar to Euphoresia bisquamulata, but slightly smaller and narrower. It differs from this species by the absence of the two white scale-like spots at the base of the pygidium. The elytra are moderately densely covered with fine scales. The underside is lighter brown, not densely covered with fine scales on the sides and abdomen.
