= Neoserica sagulata =

Scientific classification
- Kingdom: Animalia
- Phylum: Arthropoda
- Class: Insecta
- Order: Coleoptera
- Suborder: Polyphaga
- Infraorder: Scarabaeiformia
- Family: Scarabaeidae
- Genus: Neoserica
- Species: N. sagulata

Binomial name
- Neoserica sagulata (Quedenfeldt, 1884)

Synonyms
- Serica sagulata Quedenfeldt, 1884; Autoserica sagulata

Species of beetle

Neoserica sagulata is a species of beetle of the family Scarabaeidae. It is found in Angola.

== Description ==
Adults reach a length of about 10.5 mm. The head, pronotum and scutellum are brownish-black and velvety, with extremely fine, glabrous, rather widely spaced punctures. The elytra are black, smooth and iridescent, as well as rather strongly punctate and striated. The underside and legs are reddish-brown.
