= Euphoresia jokoensis =

Scientific classification
- Kingdom: Animalia
- Phylum: Arthropoda
- Clade: Pancrustacea
- Class: Insecta
- Order: Coleoptera
- Suborder: Polyphaga
- Infraorder: Scarabaeiformia
- Family: Scarabaeidae
- Genus: Euphoresia
- Species: E. jokoensis

Binomial name
- Euphoresia jokoensis Moser, 1913

Species of beetle

Euphoresia jokoensis is a species of beetle of the family Scarabaeidae. It is found in Cameroon.

== Description ==
Adults reach a length of about 10 mm. They are very similar Euphoresia semnionis, however, in the latter, the elytral ribs are slightly more convex and unscaled. The pronotum has small oval scales, scattered in the middle and somewhat closer together at the sides. A median longitudinal band and a somewhat indistinct band on either side are unscaled. The elytra are ribbed, the spaces between the ribs irregularly covered with small scales, and similar scales, albeit very sparsely distributed, are also found on the ribs.
