= Euphoresia muelleri =

Scientific classification
- Kingdom: Animalia
- Phylum: Arthropoda
- Class: Insecta
- Order: Coleoptera
- Suborder: Polyphaga
- Infraorder: Scarabaeiformia
- Family: Scarabaeidae
- Genus: Euphoresia
- Species: E. muelleri

Binomial name
- Euphoresia muelleri (Quedenfeldt, 1888)

Synonyms
- Serica muelleri Quedenfeldt, 1888

Species of beetle

Euphoresia muelleri is a species of beetle of the family Scarabaeidae. It is found in the Democratic Republic of the Congo.

== Description ==
Adults reach a length of about 8 mm. They have brownish scales on the pronotum and elytra, interspersed with white spots and with a diagonal band from the shoulder inwards and with two transverse bands.
