= Euphoresia maculata =

Scientific classification
- Kingdom: Animalia
- Phylum: Arthropoda
- Clade: Pancrustacea
- Class: Insecta
- Order: Coleoptera
- Suborder: Polyphaga
- Infraorder: Scarabaeiformia
- Family: Scarabaeidae
- Genus: Euphoresia
- Species: E. maculata

Binomial name
- Euphoresia maculata Moser, 1914

Species of beetle

Euphoresia maculata is a species of beetle of the family Scarabaeidae. It is found in the Democratic Republic of the Congo.

== Description ==
Adults reach a length of about 9 mm (0.35 in). They are similar to Euphoresia bequaerti, but differs in the shape of the scales and the absence of some larger scales on the elytra. The clypeus is coppery, shiny, weakly wrinkled, and sparsely punctate. The punctures are bristled with erect hairs on the anterior part of the clypeus, while they are scale-like on the posterior part. The frons is dull, olive-green, widely covered in the middle with oval scales, while a ring of such scales is present next to the eyes. The pronotum is olive-green, but more or less reddish-brown at the sides. It is moderately densely and unevenly covered with narrow, oval scales. In the posterior part, there is a narrow, scaleless median longitudinal band. The scutellum bears a weak, scale-free median longitudinal keel. The elytra are reddish-brown and the oblong, oval scales are moderately dense and irregularly spaced. The interstices between the longitudinal lines are barely convex and bear olive-green, with scaleless spots on the alternating spaces. The pygidium is reddish-brown with a dark central longitudinal band.
