= Euphoresia trochaloides =

Scientific classification
- Kingdom: Animalia
- Phylum: Arthropoda
- Class: Insecta
- Order: Coleoptera
- Suborder: Polyphaga
- Infraorder: Scarabaeiformia
- Family: Scarabaeidae
- Genus: Euphoresia
- Species: E. trochaloides

Binomial name
- Euphoresia trochaloides (Nonfried, 1891)

Synonyms
- Serica trochaloides Nonfried, 1891

Species of beetle

Euphoresia trochaloides is a species of beetle of the family Scarabaeidae. It is found in Guinea.

== Description ==
Adults reach a length of about 11–12 mm. They are very similar to Euphoresia semnionis, but larger and the small scales on the surface are smaller everywhere. Only the large, scattered scales of the transverse row on the neck shield and the stripe on the elytra are the same size as in E. semnionis. The dark, heart-shaped spot on the pygidium remains further from the apex in E. trochaloides, and the scales of the segments are more punctate, while in E. semnionis they are elongated.
