= Sphaerotrochalus matabelensis =

Scientific classification
- Kingdom: Animalia
- Phylum: Arthropoda
- Clade: Pancrustacea
- Class: Insecta
- Order: Coleoptera
- Suborder: Polyphaga
- Infraorder: Scarabaeiformia
- Family: Scarabaeidae
- Genus: Sphaerotrochalus
- Species: S. matabelensis

Binomial name
- Sphaerotrochalus matabelensis Moser, 1921

Species of beetle

Sphaerotrochalus matabelensis is a species of beetle of the family Scarabaeidae. It is found in Zimbabwe.

== Description ==
Adults reach a length of about 6 mm. They are very similar to Sphaerotrochalus boehmi, but has much denser punctation on the upper surface. The elytra are reddish-brown with black suture and black sides, as well as a black longitudinal streak. The underside is black.
