= Euphoresia maculipennis =

Scientific classification
- Kingdom: Animalia
- Phylum: Arthropoda
- Class: Insecta
- Order: Coleoptera
- Suborder: Polyphaga
- Infraorder: Scarabaeiformia
- Family: Scarabaeidae
- Genus: Euphoresia
- Species: E. maculipennis

Binomial name
- Euphoresia maculipennis (Quedenfeldt, 1884)

Synonyms
- Serica maculipennis Quedenfeldt, 1884

Species of beetle

Euphoresia maculipennis is a species of beetle of the family Scarabaeidae. It is found in Angola.

== Description ==
Adults reach a length of about 5.5–6 mm. They have an egg-shaped body. The head is coppery at the front, strongly punctate, with a narrow, evenly upturned margin, scarcely indented at the front. The back of the head is green, less glossy and finely sparsely punctate. The pronotum is green, but yellowish-red at the lateral and posterior margins, somewhat iridescent and widely punctate. Each puncture has a very small yellowish scale. The scutellum is densely scaled except along the median line. The elytra are yellowish-red, with a slight iridescence, either uniformly coloured or with elongated dark green spots on the convex intervals, sparsely punctate with scales. The underside is blackish-green, dull and densely and finely punctate. The scales within the punctures are very small.
