= Euphoresia costipennis =

Scientific classification
- Kingdom: Animalia
- Phylum: Arthropoda
- Class: Insecta
- Order: Coleoptera
- Suborder: Polyphaga
- Infraorder: Scarabaeiformia
- Family: Scarabaeidae
- Genus: Euphoresia
- Species: E. costipennis

Binomial name
- Euphoresia costipennis (Quedenfeldt, 1884)

Synonyms
- Serica costipennis Quedenfeldt, 1884

Species of beetle

Euphoresia costipennis is a species of beetle of the family Scarabaeidae. It is found in Angola.

== Description ==
Adults reach a length of about 11 mm. The pronotum is very finely sparsely punctate, covered with individual, sometimes grouped, white setae. The lateral margin is also somewhat more densely scaled. The elytra are dirty yellowish-brown, slightly glossy, the ribs metallic green or coppery with a faint iridescence, the intervals densely punctate and somewhat irregularly covered with small white scales.
