= Euphoresia sulcipennis =

Scientific classification
- Kingdom: Animalia
- Phylum: Arthropoda
- Clade: Pancrustacea
- Class: Insecta
- Order: Coleoptera
- Suborder: Polyphaga
- Infraorder: Scarabaeiformia
- Family: Scarabaeidae
- Genus: Euphoresia
- Species: E. sulcipennis

Binomial name
- Euphoresia sulcipennis Moser, 1913

Species of beetle

Euphoresia sulcipennis is a species of beetle of the family Scarabaeidae. It is found in the Democratic Republic of the Congo.

== Description ==
Adults reach a length of about 9 mm. They are brown, but the frons and pronotum are green and the scales are whitish-yellow. The frons has a few scales in the middle and a dense ring of scales next to the eyes. On the pronotum, the scales are widely spaced in the middle and more closely spaced along the lateral margins. The elytra have broad longitudinal lines, each containing two rows of small scales.
