= Euphoresia ogoweana =

Scientific classification
- Kingdom: Animalia
- Phylum: Arthropoda
- Class: Insecta
- Order: Coleoptera
- Suborder: Polyphaga
- Infraorder: Scarabaeiformia
- Family: Scarabaeidae
- Genus: Euphoresia
- Species: E. ogoweana

Binomial name
- Euphoresia ogoweana Brenske, 1901

Species of beetle

Euphoresia ogoweana is a species of beetle of the family Scarabaeidae. It is found in the Republic of the Congo.

== Description ==
Adults reach a length of about 7.5 mm. The surface scales are very fine, with the larger scales therefore very conspicuous. The scutellum is very densely scaled except for a small basal spot. The frons has only a few whitish scales and the pronotum is finely but quite unevenly scaled. At the anterior margin the scales are somewhat denser, near the lateral spots they form two faint white spots. The weakly striated elytra are very irregularly spotted. The scale spots are very faint and barely stand out. The larger, scattered scales are ovate and pointed.
