= Euphoresia =

Scientific classification
- Kingdom: Animalia
- Phylum: Arthropoda
- Class: Insecta
- Order: Coleoptera
- Suborder: Polyphaga
- Infraorder: Scarabaeiformia
- Family: Scarabaeidae
- Subfamily: Sericinae
- Tribe: Sericini
- Genus: Euphoresia; Brenske, 1898

Genus of leaf beetles

Euphoresia is a genus of beetles belonging to the family Scarabaeidae.

== Species ==
- Euphoresia albofasciata Brenske, 1901
- Euphoresia albosparsa Moser, 1913
- Euphoresia annae Burgeon, 1942
- Euphoresia annulata Burgeon, 1942
- Euphoresia aschantica Brenske, 1901
- Euphoresia assiniensis Moser, 1918
- Euphoresia baliola Brenske, 1901
- Euphoresia baloghi Frey, 1968
- Euphoresia benitoensis Brenske, 1900
- Euphoresia bequaerti Moser, 1914
- Euphoresia bisignata Moser, 1913
- Euphoresia bisquamulata Brenske, 1901
- Euphoresia bruta Brenske, 1901
- Euphoresia burgeoni Moser, 1926
- Euphoresia buttneri Brenske, 1900
- Euphoresia candezei Brenske, 1900
- Euphoresia caviventris Burgeon, 1942
- Euphoresia chiloanga Brenske, 1901
- Euphoresia coiffaiti Frey, 1972
- Euphoresia congoensis Moser, 1916
- Euphoresia conradti Brenske, 1901
- Euphoresia costipennis (Quedenfeldt, 1884)
- Euphoresia densesquamosa Frey, 1976
- Euphoresia egregia Moser, 1917
- Euphoresia excellens Frey, 1968
- Euphoresia gabonana Moser, 1916
- Euphoresia gabonensis Brenske, 1901
- Euphoresia ghesquiereana Burgeon, 1942
- Euphoresia gibbosa Brenske, 1901
- Euphoresia graueri Moser, 1918
- Euphoresia heteropyga Moser, 1913
- Euphoresia hiekei Frey, 1972
- Euphoresia insularis Frey, 1960
- Euphoresia iridicostis Burgeon, 1942
- Euphoresia jokoensis Moser, 1913
- Euphoresia kapangana Burgeon, 1942
- Euphoresia kassaiensis Moser, 1916
- Euphoresia kivuana Brenske, 1901
- Euphoresia kivuensis Burgeon, 1942
- Euphoresia kohli Moser, 1917
- Euphoresia kossowana Brenske, 1900
- Euphoresia labiata Brenske, 1901
- Euphoresia laminata Moser, 1916
- Euphoresia lindemannae Frey, 1972
- Euphoresia loangoana Brenske, 1901
- Euphoresia longisquamis Burgeon, 1942
- Euphoresia ludificans Brenske, 1901
- Euphoresia lulengae Burgeon, 1942
- Euphoresia maculata Moser, 1914
- Euphoresia maculifera Brenske, 1901
- Euphoresia maculipennis (Quedenfeldt, 1884)
- Euphoresia maculiscutum (Fairmaire, 1891)
- Euphoresia margaritifera Burgeon, 1942
- Euphoresia metasternalis Brenske, 1900
- Euphoresia muelleri (Quedenfeldt, 1888)
- Euphoresia multipunctata Brenske, 1900
- Euphoresia murina (Gyllenhal, 1817)
- Euphoresia ogoweana Brenske, 1901
- Euphoresia overlaetiana Burgeon, 1942
- Euphoresia propinqua Moser, 1917
- Euphoresia punctum (Thomson, 1858)
- Euphoresia pygialis Brenske, 1900
- Euphoresia rothkirchi Moser, 1916
- Euphoresia samliana Brenske, 1901
- Euphoresia schotiae Burgeon, 1942
- Euphoresia schoutedeni Moser, 1913
- Euphoresia semnionis Brenske, 1900
- Euphoresia sequens Brenske, 1901
- Euphoresia seriatipennis Moser, 1913
- Euphoresia signata Moser, 1917
- Euphoresia squamifera Frey, 1968
- Euphoresia staneriella Burgeon, 1942
- Euphoresia sulcipennis Moser, 1913
- Euphoresia tenuesquamosa Burgeon, 1942
- Euphoresia transversefasciata Burgeon, 1942
- Euphoresia trifasciata Frey, 1972
- Euphoresia trisquamosa Burgeon, 1942
- Euphoresia trochaloides (Nonfried, 1891)
- Euphoresia ugandana Kolbe, 1913
- Euphoresia variegata Moser, 1913
- Euphoresia varievestis Moser, 1916
- Euphoresia versicolor Brenske, 1901
- Euphoresia viridicans Brenske, 1901
- Euphoresia vrydaghiana Burgeon, 1942
- Euphoresia warriensis Brenske, 1901
