= Euphoresia squamifera =

Scientific classification
- Kingdom: Animalia
- Phylum: Arthropoda
- Class: Insecta
- Order: Coleoptera
- Suborder: Polyphaga
- Infraorder: Scarabaeiformia
- Family: Scarabaeidae
- Genus: Euphoresia
- Species: E. squamifera

Binomial name
- Euphoresia squamifera Frey, 1968

Species of beetle

Euphoresia squamifera is a species of beetle of the family Scarabaeidae. It is found in the Republic of the Congo.

== Description ==
Adults reach a length of about 8 mm. The upper and lower surfaces are dark brown, with the upper surface somewhat silky-glossy. The antennae are light brown and glabrous. The pronotum, elytra and scutellum are sparsely covered with scales, between which broad, setae are scattered in rows in the first sutural interval.
