= Euphoresia laminata =

Scientific classification
- Kingdom: Animalia
- Phylum: Arthropoda
- Clade: Pancrustacea
- Class: Insecta
- Order: Coleoptera
- Suborder: Polyphaga
- Infraorder: Scarabaeiformia
- Family: Scarabaeidae
- Genus: Euphoresia
- Species: E. laminata

Binomial name
- Euphoresia laminata Moser, 1916

Species of beetle

Euphoresia laminata is a species of beetle of the family Scarabaeidae. It is found in Chad and the Democratic Republic of the Congo.

== Description ==
Adults reach a length of about 8.5 mm. They are greenish-brown, dull and covered with yellowish scales. The frons is dull and sparsely punctate and next to the eyes is a ring of densely spaced yellow scales. The antennae are reddish-brown. The pronotum is densely covered with yellowish scales, but three indistinctly defined longitudinal bands are scale-free. The scutellum is densely covered with yellow scales except in the middle. The elytra are irregularly covered with yellowish scales, but the weakly convex ribs have scale-free darker spots.
