= Sphaerotrochalus tristis =

Scientific classification
- Kingdom: Animalia
- Phylum: Arthropoda
- Clade: Pancrustacea
- Class: Insecta
- Order: Coleoptera
- Suborder: Polyphaga
- Infraorder: Scarabaeiformia
- Family: Scarabaeidae
- Genus: Sphaerotrochalus
- Species: S. tristis

Binomial name
- Sphaerotrochalus tristis Moser, 1924

Species of beetle

Sphaerotrochalus tristis is a species of beetle of the family Scarabaeidae. It is found in Tanzania.

== Description ==
Adults reach a length of about 6 mm. They are black and moderately shiny. The antennae are yellow, with a blackish club.
