= Euphoresia coiffaiti =

Scientific classification
- Kingdom: Animalia
- Phylum: Arthropoda
- Class: Insecta
- Order: Coleoptera
- Suborder: Polyphaga
- Infraorder: Scarabaeiformia
- Family: Scarabaeidae
- Genus: Euphoresia
- Species: E. coiffaiti

Binomial name
- Euphoresia coiffaiti Frey, 1972

Species of beetle

Euphoresia coiffaiti is a species of beetle of the family Scarabaeidae. It is found in Gabon and Equatorial Guinea.

== Description ==
Adults reach a length of about 9–10 mm. The underside is brown, with the clypeus and ribs of the elytra faintly shiny, but otherwise dull. The antennae are light brown. The sides of the pronotum are sparsely scaled. On the disc, there are two narrow bands of scales. At the base of the elytra is a very broad transverse band of whitish scales. Two more bands are found in the middle and before the end of the elytra and there is another broad patch of scales at the apical tips.
