= Sphaerotrochalus madibiranus =

Scientific classification
- Kingdom: Animalia
- Phylum: Arthropoda
- Clade: Pancrustacea
- Class: Insecta
- Order: Coleoptera
- Suborder: Polyphaga
- Infraorder: Scarabaeiformia
- Family: Scarabaeidae
- Genus: Sphaerotrochalus
- Species: S. madibiranus

Binomial name
- Sphaerotrochalus madibiranus Moser, 1919

Species of beetle

Sphaerotrochalus madibiranus is a species of beetle of the family Scarabaeidae. It is found in Tanzania.

== Description ==
Adults reach a length of about 5 mm. They are black and weakly glossy. The frons and clypeus (behind the transverse keel) are somewhat wrinkled and punctate. The pronotum is densely punctate and on the scutellum, the punctures are somewhat more widely spaced. The intervals on the elytra are only very slightly convex, almost flat.
