= Euphoresia sequens =

Scientific classification
- Kingdom: Animalia
- Phylum: Arthropoda
- Class: Insecta
- Order: Coleoptera
- Suborder: Polyphaga
- Infraorder: Scarabaeiformia
- Family: Scarabaeidae
- Genus: Euphoresia
- Species: E. sequens

Binomial name
- Euphoresia sequens Brenske, 1901

Species of beetle

Euphoresia sequens is a species of beetle of the family Scarabaeidae. It is found in the Republic of the Congo.

== Description ==
Adults reach a length of about 6.3 mm. They are brown, dull, faintly striated, finely and widely covered with scaly hairs and with scattered distinct scales on the elytra. The frons is deeply punctured behind the suture, then very finely and only with hair-like scales. On the pronotum, whose sides are only weakly rounded anteriorly, the scales are widely spaced and leave three unconnected bands. The scales do not form spots, nor are the edges more densely scaled. The scutellum is densely scaled. The scaling of the elytra is very fine and coarse, with numerous glabrous spots, especially on the 2nd and 4th intervals.
