= Euphoresia egregia =

Scientific classification
- Kingdom: Animalia
- Phylum: Arthropoda
- Clade: Pancrustacea
- Class: Insecta
- Order: Coleoptera
- Suborder: Polyphaga
- Infraorder: Scarabaeiformia
- Family: Scarabaeidae
- Genus: Euphoresia
- Species: E. egregia

Binomial name
- Euphoresia egregia Moser, 1917

Species of beetle

Euphoresia egregia is a species of beetle of the family Scarabaeidae. It is found in the Democratic Republic of the Congo.

== Description ==
Adults reach a length of about 10 mm. They are brown, dull and covered with yellowish scales. The frons is extensively and irregularly covered with scales, which are denser near the eyes. The antennae are yellowish-brown. The pronotum is extensively covered with scales, which are somewhat denser on the sides. The median longitudinal band is scaleless. The elytra are slightly grooved and sparsely covered with fine, elongate scales, leaving some areas unscaled. A few somewhat larger scales are present.
