= Sphaerotrochalus politulus =

Scientific classification
- Kingdom: Animalia
- Phylum: Arthropoda
- Clade: Pancrustacea
- Class: Insecta
- Order: Coleoptera
- Suborder: Polyphaga
- Infraorder: Scarabaeiformia
- Family: Scarabaeidae
- Genus: Sphaerotrochalus
- Species: S. politulus

Binomial name
- Sphaerotrochalus politulus Kolbe, 1914

Species of beetle

Sphaerotrochalus politulus is a species of beetle of the family Scarabaeidae. It is found in Tanzania.

== Description ==
Adults reach a length of about 5.5 mm (0.22 in). They are small and glossy. They are similar to small, smooth specimens of Sphaerotrochalus rufosignatus. The clypeus has only a short median projection and projecting lateral angles. The pronotum is wider posteriorly and the anterior angles are less pointed. The elytra are ventricose, with the striae and spots fainter.
