= Euphoresia labiata =

Scientific classification
- Kingdom: Animalia
- Phylum: Arthropoda
- Class: Insecta
- Order: Coleoptera
- Suborder: Polyphaga
- Infraorder: Scarabaeiformia
- Family: Scarabaeidae
- Genus: Euphoresia
- Species: E. labiata

Binomial name
- Euphoresia labiata Brenske, 1901

Species of beetle

Euphoresia labiata is a species of beetle of the family Scarabaeidae. It is found in Cameroon.

== Description ==
Adults reach a length of about 8 mm. The upper surface has a strong greenish metallic sheen, especially on the elytra. The frons is only weakly punctate. The pronotum is rounded and emarginate anteriorly, rounded anteriorly and widening straight posteriorly at the sides, convex in the middle, depressed in front of the scutellum, here finely, laterally more densely, distinctly scaled. The scutellum is very densely covered with white scales, except for the basal spot. The elytra are confusedly punctate in the striae and very finely covered with white scales, the ribs bear only scattered, scale-like hairs.
