= Euphoresia burgeoni =

Scientific classification
- Kingdom: Animalia
- Phylum: Arthropoda
- Clade: Pancrustacea
- Class: Insecta
- Order: Coleoptera
- Suborder: Polyphaga
- Infraorder: Scarabaeiformia
- Family: Scarabaeidae
- Genus: Euphoresia
- Species: E. burgeoni

Binomial name
- Euphoresia burgeoni Moser, 1926

Species of beetle

Euphoresia burgeoni is a species of beetle of the family Scarabaeidae. It is found in the Democratic Republic of the Congo.

== Description ==
Adults reach a length of about 6–8 mm. They have a brown body with blackish-brown spots and with sparse white scales. The antennae are reddish-yellow.
