= Euphoresia kivuana =

Scientific classification
- Kingdom: Animalia
- Phylum: Arthropoda
- Class: Insecta
- Order: Coleoptera
- Suborder: Polyphaga
- Infraorder: Scarabaeiformia
- Family: Scarabaeidae
- Genus: Euphoresia
- Species: E. kivuana

Binomial name
- Euphoresia kivuana Brenske, 1901

Species of beetle

Euphoresia kivuana is a species of beetle of the family Scarabaeidae. It is found in the Democratic Republic of the Congo.

== Description ==
Adults reach a length of about 6 mm. They are small and brown, with pale yellow elytra, but brownish at the suture. They are dull, without luster and with a silky sheen underneath. The head, pronotum and elytra have fine scales. The pronotum is distinctly wider posteriorly, the sides somewhat rounded anteriorly, reddish with a blackish-green midline, densely covered with fine scales anteriorly, and similarly laterally, less so in the middle. The narrow scutellum is densely covered with fine scales. The elytra have only one row of punctures in the striae, the intervals are therefore relatively wide, weakly raised, inconspicuously dull, dirty yellow with spots slightly darker at the suture, sparsely covered with punctate scales, between which stand individual, more distinct, lanceolate scales. The marginal stripe is weak.
