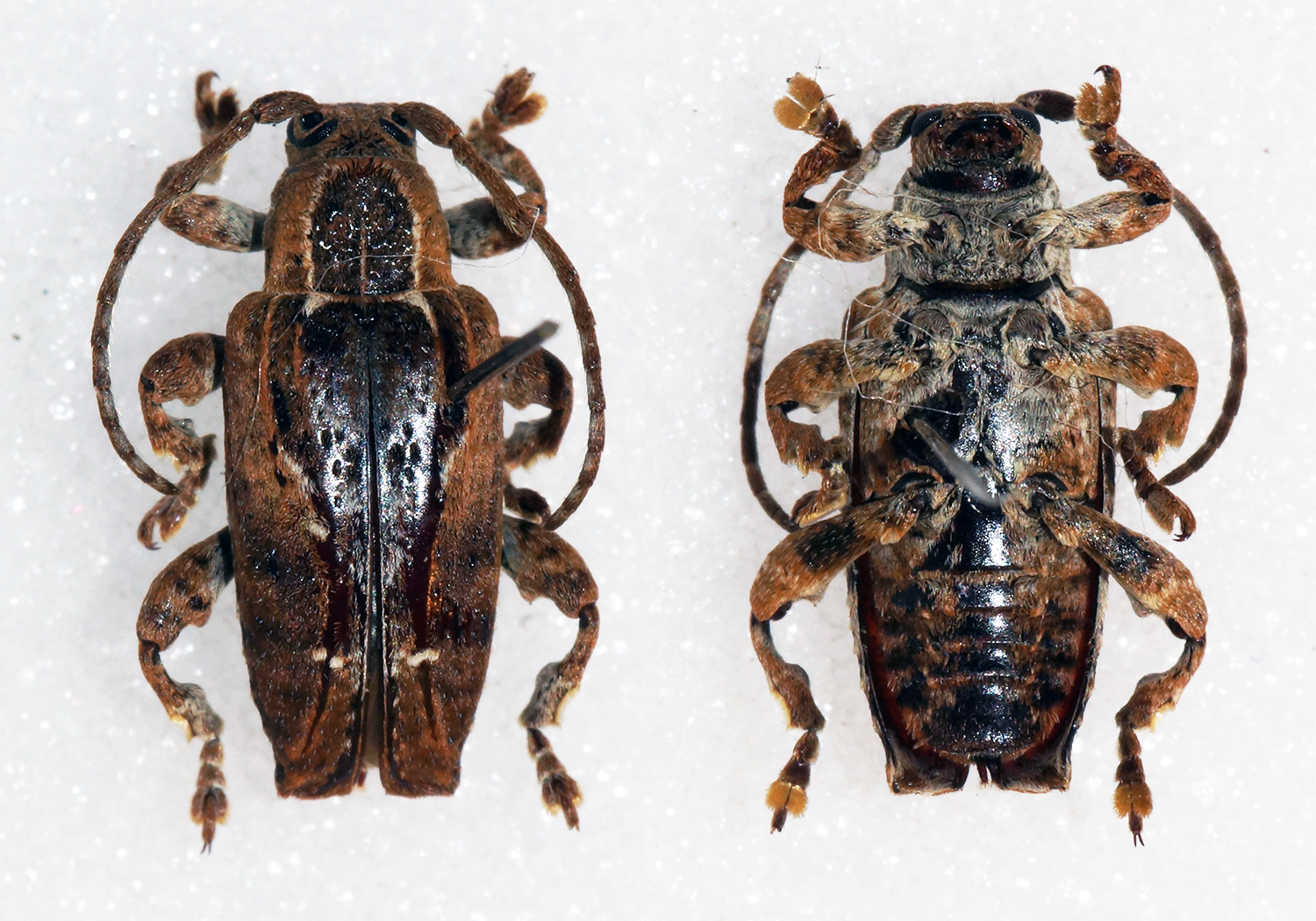
- Enaretta conifera

Scientific classification
- Domain: Eukaryota
- Kingdom: Animalia
- Phylum: Arthropoda
- Class: Insecta
- Order: Coleoptera
- Suborder: Polyphaga
- Infraorder: Cucujiformia
- Family: Cerambycidae
- Tribe: Apomecynini
- Genus: Enaretta

= Enaretta =

Genus of beetles

Enaretta is a genus of beetles in the family Cerambycidae, containing the following species:

- Enaretta acaciarum Aurivillius, 1924
- Enaretta aethiopica Breuning, 1938
- Enaretta brevicauda Breuning, 1939
- Enaretta brevicornis Lacordaire, 1872
- Enaretta castelnaudii Thomson, 1864
- Enaretta caudata (Fahraeus, 1872)
- Enaretta conifera Aurivillius, 1921
- Enaretta montana Breuning, 1938
- Enaretta paulinoi (Quedenfeldt, 1855)
- Enaretta somaliensis Breuning, 1939
- Enaretta varia (Pascoe, 1886)
