= Euphoresia samliana =

Scientific classification
- Kingdom: Animalia
- Phylum: Arthropoda
- Clade: Pancrustacea
- Class: Insecta
- Order: Coleoptera
- Suborder: Polyphaga
- Infraorder: Scarabaeiformia
- Family: Scarabaeidae
- Genus: Euphoresia
- Species: E. samliana

Binomial name
- Euphoresia samliana Brenske, 1901

Species of beetle

Euphoresia samliana is a species of beetle of the family Scarabaeidae. It is found in the Democratic Republic of the Congo and Gabon.

== Description ==
Adults reach a length of about 8 mm. They have a dull, brown, broad body. They are fairly evenly scaled and there are three darker stripes on the pronotum. The scutellum is also darkly bordered. The frons is finely scaled behind the suture. The pronotum is strongly widened posteriorly, the sides are straight, not rounded even in the anterior part, the sides are more densely covered with fine scales, but without densely spaced scales at the anterior margin. The scales are widely spaced in the middle, the punctures are distinct, the three stripes almost glabrous. The broad scutellum is densely covered with yellowish scales. The elytra are almost uniformly scaled, with the 1st, 3rd, and 5th ribs somewhat more prominent, these are somewhat less scaled, the scales are hair-like, without spots. The marginal stripe is black and ridge-like.
