= Euphoresia ludificans =

Scientific classification
- Kingdom: Animalia
- Phylum: Arthropoda
- Class: Insecta
- Order: Coleoptera
- Suborder: Polyphaga
- Infraorder: Scarabaeiformia
- Family: Scarabaeidae
- Genus: Euphoresia
- Species: E. ludificans

Binomial name
- Euphoresia ludificans Brenske, 1901

Species of beetle

Euphoresia ludificans is a species of beetle of the family Scarabaeidae. It is found in the Democratic Republic of the Congo and the Republic of the Congo.

== Description ==
Adults reach a length of about 9–10 mm. They are very similar to Euphoresia bruta, but much smaller. The frons has a few fine, tiny scales.
