= Euphoresia graueri =

Scientific classification
- Kingdom: Animalia
- Phylum: Arthropoda
- Clade: Pancrustacea
- Class: Insecta
- Order: Coleoptera
- Suborder: Polyphaga
- Infraorder: Scarabaeiformia
- Family: Scarabaeidae
- Genus: Euphoresia
- Species: E. graueri

Binomial name
- Euphoresia graueri Moser, 1918

Species of beetle

Euphoresia graueri is a species of beetle of the family Scarabaeidae. It is found in the Democratic Republic of the Congo and Uganda.

== Description ==
Adults reach a length of about 12 mm. They are brown, dull, white-scaled, and green-spotted on the upper surface. The frons is green, with some scales in the middle and on the anterior margin, and a dense ring of scales next to the eyes. The antennae are reddish-yellow. The pronotum is quite densely covered with scales on the sides. The elytra are irregularly scaled. The scales forming several white transverse bands.
