= Sphaerotrochalus somalicola =

Scientific classification
- Kingdom: Animalia
- Phylum: Arthropoda
- Clade: Pancrustacea
- Class: Insecta
- Order: Coleoptera
- Suborder: Polyphaga
- Infraorder: Scarabaeiformia
- Family: Scarabaeidae
- Genus: Sphaerotrochalus
- Species: S. somalicola

Binomial name
- Sphaerotrochalus somalicola (Frey, 1960)

Synonyms
- Trochalus somalicola Frey, 1960

Species of beetle

Sphaerotrochalus somalicola is a species of beetle of the family Scarabaeidae. It is found in Somalia, Ethiopia, Saudi Arabia, Oman, Yemen and the United Arab Emirates.

== Taxonomy ==
Georg Frey described the species in 1960 as Trochalus somalicola, from specimens collected by C. Koch at Hadj Ali in Mudug Province, Somalia, in August 1958. Dirk Ahrens transferred it to Sphaerotrochalus in 2000. The male holotype is in the Frey collection, now at the Natural History Museum of Basel.

== Description ==
Adults reach a length of about 5.4–6.5 mm and a width of 3.2–3.8 mm. They have a black to dark reddish-brown, short, egg-shaped body. The dorsal surface is glabrous. In the original description, Frey distinguished it from Trochalus miniaticollis by its smooth, untoothed clypeal margin.

== Distribution and habitat ==
It is known from Ethiopia, Somalia and all of the Arabian Peninsula except the large desert areas. Habitats illustrated by Ahrens include Namas in Asir Province and Wadi Shuqub in Al Bahah Province, Saudi Arabia. Specimens have been collected at light on Jebel Shams in Oman. It was recorded as new for the United Arab Emirates from light-trap material taken in Wadi Maidaq and Wadi Hayl.
