= Euphoresia rothkirchi =

Scientific classification
- Kingdom: Animalia
- Phylum: Arthropoda
- Clade: Pancrustacea
- Class: Insecta
- Order: Coleoptera
- Suborder: Polyphaga
- Infraorder: Scarabaeiformia
- Family: Scarabaeidae
- Genus: Euphoresia
- Species: E. rothkirchi

Binomial name
- Euphoresia rothkirchi Moser, 1916

Species of beetle

Euphoresia rothkirchi is a species of beetle of the family Scarabaeidae. It is found in Cameroon.

== Description ==
Adults reach a length of about 6 mm. They are brown and sull, with white bristle-like scales. The frons is dull, extensively covered with scales and next to the eyes is a ring of scales. The pronotum is quite extensively covered in the middle with fine narrow scales, on the sides of the pronotum the scales are a little stronger and more dense. Three middle longitudinal bands are darker and scale-free. The scutellum is scaled except in the middle. The elytra are striated, with the intervals weakly convex. They are quite sparsely covered with tiny, bristle-like scales, some of which are larger. Dark, scaleless patches are found in the spaces between them.
