= Euphoresia versicolor =

Scientific classification
- Kingdom: Animalia
- Phylum: Arthropoda
- Class: Insecta
- Order: Coleoptera
- Suborder: Polyphaga
- Infraorder: Scarabaeiformia
- Family: Scarabaeidae
- Genus: Euphoresia
- Species: E. versicolor

Binomial name
- Euphoresia versicolor Brenske, 1901

Species of beetle

Euphoresia versicolor is a species of beetle of the family Scarabaeidae. It is found in the Republic of the Congo.

== Description ==
Adults reach a length of about 9 mm. They are reddish-brown with dark spots on the pronotum and elytra, dense tomentum and white-spotted scales.
