= Euphoresia multipunctata =

Scientific classification
- Kingdom: Animalia
- Phylum: Arthropoda
- Class: Insecta
- Order: Coleoptera
- Suborder: Polyphaga
- Infraorder: Scarabaeiformia
- Family: Scarabaeidae
- Genus: Euphoresia
- Species: E. multipunctata

Binomial name
- Euphoresia multipunctata Brenske, 1900

Species of beetle

Euphoresia multipunctata is a species of beetle of the family Scarabaeidae. It is found in Gabon and the Republic of the Congo.

== Description ==
Adults reach a length of about 10 mm. They are similar to Euphoresia benitoensis, but the pygidium lacks the black heart-shaped spot. Instead, there is only a narrow, black stripe. The clypeus is wrinkled and punctate, with a fine, rounded elevation on the surface. The head and pronotum are vivid green, the latter not curved at the sides, almost straight, with uneven, somewhat patchy scales. The scales on the scutellum are arranged so that they do not touch each other, and therefore do not form a white spot. The elytra are indistinctly striated, with somewhat finer scales. The scales are narrower, partly hair-like. Black spots are located on the intervals, but less regularly, thus a larger area in front of the apex remains spotless. On the side, the last two intervals are black and narrowly convex, resembling ribs. The third-to-last stripe is also partially present as a black rib, especially at the shoulder.
