= Euphoresia baloghi =

Scientific classification
- Kingdom: Animalia
- Phylum: Arthropoda
- Class: Insecta
- Order: Coleoptera
- Suborder: Polyphaga
- Infraorder: Scarabaeiformia
- Family: Scarabaeidae
- Genus: Euphoresia
- Species: E. baloghi

Binomial name
- Euphoresia baloghi Frey, 1968

Species of beetle

Euphoresia baloghi is a species of beetle of the family Scarabaeidae. It is found in the Republic of the Congo.

== Description ==
Adults reach a length of about 9 mm. The upper and lower surfaces are uniformly brown and the head, pronotum and elytra, as well as the underside and pygidium are fairly densely covered with pointed scales. The pronotum has an almost smooth midline, as does the scutellum.
