= Euphoresia kohli =

Scientific classification
- Kingdom: Animalia
- Phylum: Arthropoda
- Clade: Pancrustacea
- Class: Insecta
- Order: Coleoptera
- Suborder: Polyphaga
- Infraorder: Scarabaeiformia
- Family: Scarabaeidae
- Genus: Euphoresia
- Species: E. kohli

Binomial name
- Euphoresia kohli Moser, 1917

Species of beetle

Euphoresia kohli is a species of beetle of the family Scarabaeidae. It is found in the Democratic Republic of the Congo.

== Description ==
Adults reach a length of about 6 mm. They are greenish-brown and dull, with very small white scales. The frons is green, dull, and scaled on both sides of the middle and next to the eyes. The antennae are yellowish-brown. The pronotum is very sparsely covered with bristle-like scales in the middle, becoming more densely covered at the sides. A central spot is scaleless. The elytra are striated, with the intervals extensively covered with fine scales, with elongated, darker, scale-free patches in the alternating spaces. These alternating spaces also contain a few larger scales.
