= Euphoresia lindemannae =

Scientific classification
- Kingdom: Animalia
- Phylum: Arthropoda
- Class: Insecta
- Order: Coleoptera
- Suborder: Polyphaga
- Infraorder: Scarabaeiformia
- Family: Scarabaeidae
- Genus: Euphoresia
- Species: E. lindemannae

Binomial name
- Euphoresia lindemannae Frey, 1972

Species of beetle

Euphoresia lindemannae is a species of beetle of the family Scarabaeidae. It is found in Tanzania.

== Description ==
Adults reach a length of about 8–9 mm. The upper surface is light brown with dark brown spots, while the underside is dark brown. The pronotum has a broad margin of moderately dense whitish scales on the sides and the disc is only very sparsely scaled. The elytra are fairly uniformly covered with scales.
