= Enaretta varia =

Scientific classification
- Domain: Eukaryota
- Kingdom: Animalia
- Phylum: Arthropoda
- Class: Insecta
- Order: Coleoptera
- Suborder: Polyphaga
- Infraorder: Cucujiformia
- Family: Cerambycidae
- Genus: Enaretta
- Species: E. varia

Binomial name
- Enaretta varia (Pascoe, 1886)

Species of beetle

Enaretta varia is a species of beetle in the family Cerambycidae. It was described by Pascoe in 1886.
