= Enaretta brevicornis =

Scientific classification
- Domain: Eukaryota
- Kingdom: Animalia
- Phylum: Arthropoda
- Class: Insecta
- Order: Coleoptera
- Suborder: Polyphaga
- Infraorder: Cucujiformia
- Family: Cerambycidae
- Genus: Enaretta
- Species: E. brevicornis

Binomial name
- Enaretta brevicornis Lacordaire, 1872

Species of beetle

Enaretta brevicornis is a species of beetle in the family Cerambycidae. It was described by Lacordaire in 1872.
