= Euphoresia aschantica =

Scientific classification
- Kingdom: Animalia
- Phylum: Arthropoda
- Class: Insecta
- Order: Coleoptera
- Suborder: Polyphaga
- Infraorder: Scarabaeiformia
- Family: Scarabaeidae
- Genus: Euphoresia
- Species: E. aschantica

Binomial name
- Euphoresia aschantica Brenske, 1901

Species of beetle

Euphoresia aschantica is a species of beetle of the family Scarabaeidae. It is found in Ghana.

== Description ==
Adults reach a length of about 7 mm. They have a slightly greenish sheen and are very finely scaled. The pronotum is almost completely straight at the sides, and very finely and inconspicuously covered with scales at the sides, broader and smooth in the middle, the two secondary striae next to the narrow median stria being particularly broad. The scutellum is distinctly white-scaled. The elytra have numerous elongated, greenish, glabrous spots on the ribs. There are more fine scales in the striae than on the ribs and they do not form distinct spots.
