= Euphoresia gibbosa =

Scientific classification
- Kingdom: Animalia
- Phylum: Arthropoda
- Class: Insecta
- Order: Coleoptera
- Suborder: Polyphaga
- Infraorder: Scarabaeiformia
- Family: Scarabaeidae
- Genus: Euphoresia
- Species: E. gibbosa

Binomial name
- Euphoresia gibbosa Brenske, 1901

Species of beetle

Euphoresia gibbosa is a species of beetle of the family Scarabaeidae. It is found in Gabon.

== Description ==
Adults reach a length of about 11 mm. They are dull and cherry-red above with a greenish sheen, the margin of the elytra is black. The frons has individual scales, with golden yellow eye rings. The pronotum is only slightly curved laterally, slightly projecting forward in the middle anteriorly, the posterior angles slightly rounded, sparsely covered with small and very small scales, somewhat more numerous on the sides. The scutellum is narrowly but densely scaled laterally, sparsely scaled at the base. The elytra are deeply punctate in rows, and the similarly coloured intervals are convex and almost entirely devoid of punctures. The white scales are irregularly distributed everywhere. In the rows they are very fine, in the interspaces somewhat stronger. Behind the middle they form an irregular crossband.
