= Euphoresia metasternalis =

Scientific classification
- Kingdom: Animalia
- Phylum: Arthropoda
- Class: Insecta
- Order: Coleoptera
- Suborder: Polyphaga
- Infraorder: Scarabaeiformia
- Family: Scarabaeidae
- Genus: Euphoresia
- Species: E. metasternalis

Binomial name
- Euphoresia metasternalis Brenske, 1900

Species of beetle

Euphoresia metasternalis is a species of beetle of the family Scarabaeidae. It is found in the Republic of the Congo.

== Description ==
Adults reach a length of about 11 mm. There is a semi-heart-shaped spot on the pygidium and the elytra are densely scaled in the furrows, with inconspicuous yellowish scale-like hairs outside at the apex and shoulder. The pronotum is rather elongate with strongly projecting anterior angles, straight at the sides, distinctly widened posteriorly, with a narrow median line and two lateral longitudinal spots that appear somewhat raised because the adjacent faint scale-like spots are depressed. The scales form a narrow, denser band at the anterior and lateral margins. The sides of the scutellum are densely scaled. On the elytra, the raised ribs are smooth, without spots, and only very occasionally covered with slightly stronger scales.
