= Euphoresia assiniensis =

Scientific classification
- Kingdom: Animalia
- Phylum: Arthropoda
- Clade: Pancrustacea
- Class: Insecta
- Order: Coleoptera
- Suborder: Polyphaga
- Infraorder: Scarabaeiformia
- Family: Scarabaeidae
- Genus: Euphoresia
- Species: E. assiniensis

Binomial name
- Euphoresia assiniensis Moser, 1918

Species of beetle

Euphoresia assiniensis is a species of beetle of the family Scarabaeidae. It is found in Ivory Coast.

== Description ==
Adults reach a length of about 7.5–8 mm. They are brown, dull, more or less dark green mottled, and with whitish scales. The antennae are yellowish-brown. The pronotum has fine scales that are scattered in the middle, while the scales are stronger and form spots along the lateral margins. On the elytra, the intervals are slightly convex and irregularly covered with fine scales, which leave unscaled spots. A few larger scales are present on the alternating intervals.
