= Enaretta caudata =

Scientific classification
- Domain: Eukaryota
- Kingdom: Animalia
- Phylum: Arthropoda
- Class: Insecta
- Order: Coleoptera
- Suborder: Polyphaga
- Infraorder: Cucujiformia
- Family: Cerambycidae
- Genus: Enaretta
- Species: E. caudata

Binomial name
- Enaretta caudata (Fahraeus, 1872)

Species of beetle

Enaretta caudata is a species of beetle in the family Cerambycidae. It was described by Fahraeus in 1872.
