= Euphoresia murina =

Scientific classification
- Kingdom: Animalia
- Phylum: Arthropoda
- Class: Insecta
- Order: Coleoptera
- Suborder: Polyphaga
- Infraorder: Scarabaeiformia
- Family: Scarabaeidae
- Genus: Euphoresia
- Species: E. murina

Binomial name
- Euphoresia murina (Gyllenhal, 1817)

Synonyms
- Melolontha murina Gyllenhal, 1817

Species of beetle

Euphoresia murina is a species of beetle of the family Scarabaeidae. It is found in Sierra Leone.

== Description ==
Adults reach a length of about 4–5 mm. They have hair-like scales on the elytra, with bare spots arranged in rows.
