= Euphoresia hiekei =

Scientific classification
- Kingdom: Animalia
- Phylum: Arthropoda
- Class: Insecta
- Order: Coleoptera
- Suborder: Polyphaga
- Infraorder: Scarabaeiformia
- Family: Scarabaeidae
- Genus: Euphoresia
- Species: E. hiekei

Binomial name
- Euphoresia hiekei Frey, 1972

Species of beetle

Euphoresia hiekei is a species of beetle of the family Scarabaeidae. It is found in Equatorial Guinea.

== Description ==
Adults reach a length of about 12–13 mm. The upper and lower surfaces are brown and barely shiny. The antennae are light brown. The pronotum has oval scales of varying sizes, densely covered only at the margin. The disc has only a few scales in the middle. On the elytra, the scales form three transverse bands.
