= Euphoresia loangoana =

Scientific classification
- Kingdom: Animalia
- Phylum: Arthropoda
- Class: Insecta
- Order: Coleoptera
- Suborder: Polyphaga
- Infraorder: Scarabaeiformia
- Family: Scarabaeidae
- Genus: Euphoresia
- Species: E. loangoana

Binomial name
- Euphoresia loangoana Brenske, 1901

Species of beetle

Euphoresia loangoana is a species of beetle of the family Scarabaeidae. It is found in the Democratic Republic of the Congo.

== Description ==
Adults reach a length of about 8 mm. The pronotum has a dark, smooth median stripe and the stronger scales are absent on the elytra, whose second stripe is alternately scaled and smooth. The pronotum is slightly projecting in the middle of the anterior margin, where it is somewhat more densely scaled. The scales are very small everywhere. The median stripe and a spot on each side in the middle are scale-free. At the anterior margin of these spots and towards the sides, the scales are somewhat more distinct. The scutellum is densely scaled except for a median line, though less conspicuously. The elytra are striated, with the ribs barely raised and covered one after the other with smooth spots, between which are spots of scales. This pattern is particularly distinct on the first rib. On the others, it is not as sharply defined.
