= Euphoresia buttneri =

Scientific classification
- Kingdom: Animalia
- Phylum: Arthropoda
- Class: Insecta
- Order: Coleoptera
- Suborder: Polyphaga
- Infraorder: Scarabaeiformia
- Family: Scarabaeidae
- Genus: Euphoresia
- Species: E. buttneri

Binomial name
- Euphoresia buttneri Brenske, 1900

Species of beetle

Euphoresia buttneri is a species of beetle of the family Scarabaeidae. It is found in Togo.

== Description ==
Adults reach a length of about 12 mm. They are very similar to Euphoresia maculiscutum, but the sides of the pronotum are not curved. There are dark spots on each interval of the elytra.
