= Euphoresia staneriella =

Scientific classification
- Kingdom: Animalia
- Phylum: Arthropoda
- Clade: Pancrustacea
- Class: Insecta
- Order: Coleoptera
- Suborder: Polyphaga
- Infraorder: Scarabaeiformia
- Family: Scarabaeidae
- Genus: Euphoresia
- Species: E. staneriella

Binomial name
- Euphoresia staneriella Burgeon, 1942

Species of beetle

Euphoresia staneriella is a species of beetle of the family Scarabaeidae. It is found in the Democratic Republic of the Congo.
