= Euphoresia kossowana =

Scientific classification
- Kingdom: Animalia
- Phylum: Arthropoda
- Class: Insecta
- Order: Coleoptera
- Suborder: Polyphaga
- Infraorder: Scarabaeiformia
- Family: Scarabaeidae
- Genus: Euphoresia
- Species: E. kossowana

Binomial name
- Euphoresia kossowana Brenske, 1900

Species of beetle

Euphoresia kossowana is a species of beetle of the family Scarabaeidae. It is found in Tanzania.

== Description ==
Adults reach a length of about 11 mm. They are greenish, dull, with a large black spot on the elytra. The ribs are uniformly weakly raised, with scattered coarse scales and the scutellum is densely covered with spotted scales.
