= Euphoresia bequaerti =

Scientific classification
- Kingdom: Animalia
- Phylum: Arthropoda
- Clade: Pancrustacea
- Class: Insecta
- Order: Coleoptera
- Suborder: Polyphaga
- Infraorder: Scarabaeiformia
- Family: Scarabaeidae
- Genus: Euphoresia
- Species: E. bequaerti

Binomial name
- Euphoresia bequaerti Moser, 1914

Synonyms
- Euphoresia bequaerti staneri Burgeon, 1942

Species of beetle

Euphoresia bequaerti is a species of beetle of the family Scarabaeidae. It is found in the Democratic Republic of the Congo.

== Description ==
Adults reach a length of about 9 mm (0.35 in). They are similar to Euphoresia bisquamulata, but larger and lacks scale-like spots on the pygidium. The reddish-brown clypeus is glossy, wrinkled and punctate, and its upturned anterior margin is weakly emarginate. The frons is olive-green, with only scattered yellowish scales in the middle and dense scales near the eyes. The antennae are yellowish-brown. The pronotum, like the elytra, is olive-brown. It is very sparsely and irregularly scaled in the middle, with an indistinct, scaled longitudinal band along the sides. The scutellum, except for the middle of the base, is densely covered with yellowish scales. On the elytra, the small, lanceolate scales are moderately dense, with occasional, more robust scales. The intervals between the striae are only very weakly convex and bear several dark, scaleless spots. The scales are slightly denser in the spaces between these spots. The pygidium, apart from a shortened, scaleless median band at the rear, bears narrow, sparsely spaced scales. The underside is dull, except for the tibiae and tarsi.
