= Euphoresia trifasciata =

Scientific classification
- Kingdom: Animalia
- Phylum: Arthropoda
- Class: Insecta
- Order: Coleoptera
- Suborder: Polyphaga
- Infraorder: Scarabaeiformia
- Family: Scarabaeidae
- Genus: Euphoresia
- Species: E. trifasciata

Binomial name
- Euphoresia trifasciata Frey, 1972

Species of beetle

Euphoresia trifasciata is a species of beetle of the family Scarabaeidae. It is found in Gabon.

== Description ==
Adults reach a length of about 8–9 mm. The upper and lower surfaces are brown and mostly dull (only the clypeus is shiny). The antennae are light brown. The anterior margin of the pronotum and the base have a sparse fringe of scales, while the sides of the pronotum are densely and uniformly covered with white scales. The elytra have three continuous white transverse bands of scales.
