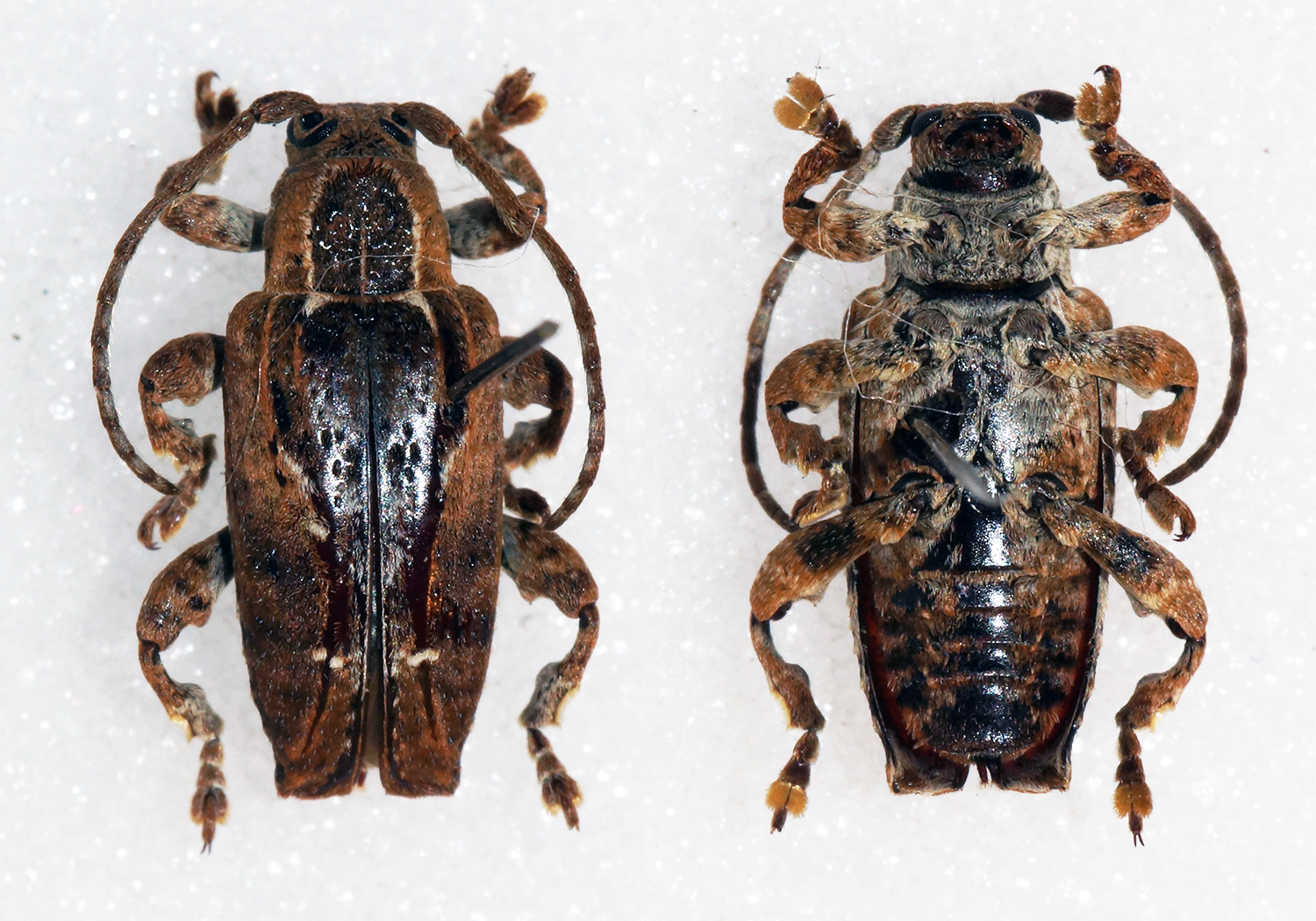

Scientific classification
- Domain: Eukaryota
- Kingdom: Animalia
- Phylum: Arthropoda
- Class: Insecta
- Order: Coleoptera
- Suborder: Polyphaga
- Infraorder: Cucujiformia
- Family: Cerambycidae
- Genus: Enaretta
- Species: E. conifera

Binomial name
- Enaretta conifera Aurivillius, 1921

= Enaretta conifera =

Species of beetle

Enaretta conifera is a species of beetle in the family Cerambycidae. It was described by Per Olof Christopher Aurivillius in 1921.
