= Euphoresia candezei =

Scientific classification
- Kingdom: Animalia
- Phylum: Arthropoda
- Class: Insecta
- Order: Coleoptera
- Suborder: Polyphaga
- Infraorder: Scarabaeiformia
- Family: Scarabaeidae
- Genus: Euphoresia
- Species: E. candezei

Binomial name
- Euphoresia candezei Brenske, 1900

Species of beetle

Euphoresia candezei is a species of beetle of the family Scarabaeidae. It is found in Nigeria.

== Description ==
Adults reach a length of about 9 mm. The spots on the elytra appear in rows, from which a black spot at the apex is clearly separated. The frons is covered with scales in the middle. The pronotum is finely covered with hair-like scales without larger scales. On the elytra, the scales are also fine, lanceolate, without stronger scales in between. The spots in rows are not very prominent, as they are hardly darker in colour. The entire underside is evenly but thinly scaled. The scales are very fine.
