= Sphaerotrochalus =

Scientific classification
- Kingdom: Animalia
- Phylum: Arthropoda
- Clade: Pancrustacea
- Class: Insecta
- Order: Coleoptera
- Suborder: Polyphaga
- Infraorder: Scarabaeiformia
- Family: Scarabaeidae
- Subfamily: Sericinae
- Tribe: Sericini
- Genus: Sphaerotrochalus; Brenske, 1900

Genus of leaf beetles

Sphaerotrochalus is a genus of beetles belonging to the family Scarabaeidae.

== Species ==
- Sphaerotrochalus boehmi (Quedenfeldt, 1888)
- Sphaerotrochalus brunneus Moser, 1924
- Sphaerotrochalus madibiranus Moser, 1919
- Sphaerotrochalus matabelensis Moser, 1921
- Sphaerotrochalus politulus Kolbe, 1914
- Sphaerotrochalus robustus (Blanchard, 1850)
- Sphaerotrochalus rufosignatus Kolbe, 1910
- Sphaerotrochalus simillimus Moser, 1919
- Sphaerotrochalus somalicola (Frey, 1960)
- Sphaerotrochalus tridentatus (Moser, 1916)
- Sphaerotrochalus tristis Moser, 1924
- Sphaerotrochalus wintgensi Kolbe, 1914
