= Sphaerotrochalus wintgensi =

Scientific classification
- Kingdom: Animalia
- Phylum: Arthropoda
- Clade: Pancrustacea
- Class: Insecta
- Order: Coleoptera
- Suborder: Polyphaga
- Infraorder: Scarabaeiformia
- Family: Scarabaeidae
- Genus: Sphaerotrochalus
- Species: S. wintgensi

Binomial name
- Sphaerotrochalus wintgensi Kolbe, 1914

Species of beetle

Sphaerotrochalus wintgensi is a species of beetle of the family Scarabaeidae. It is found in Tanzania.

== Description ==
Adults reach a length of about 8 mm (0.31 in). They are similar to Sphaerotrochalus robustus, but somewhat larger and more robustly built. They are dull black, with the elytra brownish-red, and all margins black and with various long yellow fringes.
