= Euphoresia variegata =

Scientific classification
- Kingdom: Animalia
- Phylum: Arthropoda
- Clade: Pancrustacea
- Class: Insecta
- Order: Coleoptera
- Suborder: Polyphaga
- Infraorder: Scarabaeiformia
- Family: Scarabaeidae
- Genus: Euphoresia
- Species: E. variegata

Binomial name
- Euphoresia variegata Moser, 1913

Species of beetle

Euphoresia variegata is a species of beetle of the family Scarabaeidae. It is found in the Democratic Republic of the Congo.

== Description ==
Adults reach a length of about 18 mm. The upper surface is olive-brown, with darker spots. The frons is densely covered with scales next to the eyes. The pronotum has small, somewhat widely spaced scales. There is a M-shaped marking on the disc. On the elytra, the scales are very irregularly arranged, forming indistinct light patches. Some elongated scales are significantly larger and stand out in a bristle-like manner. A row of long setae is located along the lateral margin.
