= Euphoresia gabonana =

Scientific classification
- Kingdom: Animalia
- Phylum: Arthropoda
- Clade: Pancrustacea
- Class: Insecta
- Order: Coleoptera
- Suborder: Polyphaga
- Infraorder: Scarabaeiformia
- Family: Scarabaeidae
- Genus: Euphoresia
- Species: E. gabonana

Binomial name
- Euphoresia gabonana Moser, 1916

Species of beetle

Euphoresia gabonana is a species of beetle of the family Scarabaeidae. It is found in Gabon.

== Description ==
Adults reach a length of about 7.5 mm. They are dull, dark olive-brown above and brown below. The frons is dull, with extensive scaling in the middle with and a ring of yellowish scales next to the eyes. The antennae are brown. The pronotum is extensively covered with elongated whitish scales, while a median longitudinal band and some indistinct spots are scale-free and darker. The scutellum is scaled except in the middle, but the scales are not particularly dense. The elytra are striated, with the intervals weakly convex, and the alternating intervals wider. The whitish scales are irregularly arranged and of unequal size. The wider intervals show scale-free, darker spots, which are separated by patches of larger scales.
