= Euphoresia seriatipennis =

Scientific classification
- Kingdom: Animalia
- Phylum: Arthropoda
- Clade: Pancrustacea
- Class: Insecta
- Order: Coleoptera
- Suborder: Polyphaga
- Infraorder: Scarabaeiformia
- Family: Scarabaeidae
- Genus: Euphoresia
- Species: E. seriatipennis

Binomial name
- Euphoresia seriatipennis Moser, 1913

Species of beetle

Euphoresia seriatipennis is a species of beetle of the family Scarabaeidae. It is found in Uganda and the Central African Republic.

== Description ==
Adults reach a length of about 11 mm. The upper surface is olive-coloured, while the head and pronotum are more brownish. The frons has scattered small scales, and next to the eyes is a dense ring of larger yellow scales. The pronotum has three darker longitudinal bands and is moderately densely covered with very small scales.
