= Enaretta acaciarum =

Scientific classification
- Domain: Eukaryota
- Kingdom: Animalia
- Phylum: Arthropoda
- Class: Insecta
- Order: Coleoptera
- Suborder: Polyphaga
- Infraorder: Cucujiformia
- Family: Cerambycidae
- Genus: Enaretta
- Species: E. acaciarum

Binomial name
- Enaretta acaciarum Aurivillius, 1924

Species of beetle

Enaretta acaciarum is a species of beetle in the family Cerambycidae. It was described by Per Olof Christopher Aurivillius in 1924.
