= Enaretta aethiopica =

Scientific classification
- Kingdom: Animalia
- Phylum: Arthropoda
- Class: Insecta
- Order: Coleoptera
- Suborder: Polyphaga
- Infraorder: Cucujiformia
- Family: Cerambycidae
- Genus: Enaretta
- Species: E. aethiopica

Binomial name
- Enaretta aethiopica Breuning, 1938

Species of beetle

Enaretta aethiopica is a species of beetle in the family Cerambycidae. It was described by Breuning in 1938.
