= Euphoresia conradti =

Scientific classification
- Kingdom: Animalia
- Phylum: Arthropoda
- Class: Insecta
- Order: Coleoptera
- Suborder: Polyphaga
- Infraorder: Scarabaeiformia
- Family: Scarabaeidae
- Genus: Euphoresia
- Species: E. conradti

Binomial name
- Euphoresia conradti Brenske, 1901

Species of beetle

Euphoresia conradti is a species of beetle of the family Scarabaeidae. It is found in Togo.

== Description ==
Adults reach a length of about 6 mm. The elytra are weakly striated, mottled with fine scale-like hairs and individual distinct, narrow scales. The underside is sparsely scaled. The pronotum is somewhat rounded laterally anteriorly, weakly covered with scale-like hairs, with three dark, glabrous longitudinal striae. The scutellum is somewhat more densely scaled. On the elytra, the striae and the intervals are almost of the same width, uniformly covered with very fine hair-like scales, without rows and without scale patches. On the second rib, there are several glabrous spots that are not very noticeable.
