= Euphoresia albofasciata =

Scientific classification
- Kingdom: Animalia
- Phylum: Arthropoda
- Class: Insecta
- Order: Coleoptera
- Suborder: Polyphaga
- Infraorder: Scarabaeiformia
- Family: Scarabaeidae
- Genus: Euphoresia
- Species: E. albofasciata

Binomial name
- Euphoresia albofasciata Brenske, 1901

Species of beetle

Euphoresia albofasciata is a species of beetle of the family Scarabaeidae. It is found in the Republic of the Congo.

== Description ==
Adults reach a length of about 10 mm. They are dark green or reddish-brown with dense tomentum. The scutellum has a narrow, dense band of scales laterally and the elytra are mottled and scaled, with a loose transverse band before the apex.
