= Euphoresia kivuensis =

Scientific classification
- Kingdom: Animalia
- Phylum: Arthropoda
- Clade: Pancrustacea
- Class: Insecta
- Order: Coleoptera
- Suborder: Polyphaga
- Infraorder: Scarabaeiformia
- Family: Scarabaeidae
- Genus: Euphoresia
- Species: E. kivuensis

Binomial name
- Euphoresia kivuensis Burgeon, 1942

Synonyms
- Euphoresia kivuensis mareei Burgeon, 1942

Species of beetle

Euphoresia kivuensis is a species of beetle of the family Scarabaeidae. It is found in the Democratic Republic of the Congo.

== Subspecies ==
- Euphoresia kivuensis kivuensis (Democratic Republic of the Congo)
- Euphoresia kivuensis achteni Burgeon, 1942 (Democratic Republic of the Congo)
