= Euphoresia schoutedeni =

Scientific classification
- Kingdom: Animalia
- Phylum: Arthropoda
- Clade: Pancrustacea
- Class: Insecta
- Order: Coleoptera
- Suborder: Polyphaga
- Infraorder: Scarabaeiformia
- Family: Scarabaeidae
- Genus: Euphoresia
- Species: E. schoutedeni

Binomial name
- Euphoresia schoutedeni Moser, 1913

Species of beetle

Euphoresia schoutedeni is a species of beetle of the family Scarabaeidae. It is found in the Democratic Republic of the Congo.

== Description ==
Adults reach a length of about 11 mm. The clypeus is brown and glossy with punctures bearing erect setae. The frons is green and dull, widely covered in the middle with yellow scales, while these form a dense ring next to the eyes. The pronotum is olive-green, dull and extensively covered with yellow scales, which leave a scaleless midline. The elytra are brown, slightly glossy and ribbed. The interspaces are covered with yellow bristle-like scales. The pygidium is dull, black or brown and moderately densely covered with yellow, scale-like setae.
