= Euphoresia densesquamosa =

Scientific classification
- Kingdom: Animalia
- Phylum: Arthropoda
- Class: Insecta
- Order: Coleoptera
- Suborder: Polyphaga
- Infraorder: Scarabaeiformia
- Family: Scarabaeidae
- Genus: Euphoresia
- Species: E. densesquamosa

Binomial name
- Euphoresia densesquamosa Frey, 1976

Species of beetle

Euphoresia densesquamosa is a species of beetle of the family Scarabaeidae. It is found in Cameroon.

== Description ==
Adults reach a length of about 9–11 mm. The upper and lower surfaces are uniformly dark green, dull and without spots. The head, pronotum and elytra are covered with whitish, small, elongated scales. The frons and vertex bear scales only in the middle, while the eyes have a dense ring of scales. The pronotum has three elongated, less densely scaled striae and the scales are slightly larger at the margins. The scutellum has a dense margin of yellowish scales and is smooth in the middle. The whitish scales on the elytra are more or less densely packed. There are few in the furrows, and the ribs are mostly scale-free. The apex of the elytra is again evenly scaled. There is a smooth, heart-shaped spot on the pygidium. The antennae are yellow with a brown club.
