= Euphoresia propinqua =

Scientific classification
- Kingdom: Animalia
- Phylum: Arthropoda
- Clade: Pancrustacea
- Class: Insecta
- Order: Coleoptera
- Suborder: Polyphaga
- Infraorder: Scarabaeiformia
- Family: Scarabaeidae
- Genus: Euphoresia
- Species: E. propinqua

Binomial name
- Euphoresia propinqua Moser, 1917

Species of beetle

Euphoresia propinqua is a species of beetle of the family Scarabaeidae. It is found in the Democratic Republic of the Congo.

== Description ==
Adults reach a length of about 6 mm. They are greenish-brown above and brown below, with yellowish-white scales. The frons is green and dull, scaled beside the middle, behind the suture, and next to the eyes. The antennae are yellowish-red. The pronotum is extensively covered with small scales, except for a median longitudinal band. There is a densely scaled patch on each side. The elytra have rows of scales, with the spaces between extensively scaled.
