= Euphoresia signata =

Scientific classification
- Kingdom: Animalia
- Phylum: Arthropoda
- Clade: Pancrustacea
- Class: Insecta
- Order: Coleoptera
- Suborder: Polyphaga
- Infraorder: Scarabaeiformia
- Family: Scarabaeidae
- Genus: Euphoresia
- Species: E. signata

Binomial name
- Euphoresia signata Moser, 1917

Species of beetle

Euphoresia signata is a species of beetle of the family Scarabaeidae. It is found in the Democratic Republic of the Congo.

== Description ==
Adults reach a length of about 5.5 mm. They are brown, dull and scaled. The dull frons is green and covered with scales behind the suture and beside the eyes. The antennae are yellowish-brown. The pronotum is moderately densely covered with fine scales, more densely on the sides. There are three green median longitudinal bands, which are scale-free. The elytra have very fine scales in the rows and the intervals, which are extensively scaled, have scale-free spots that are blackish-green on the alternating intervals.
