= Euphoresia congoensis =

Scientific classification
- Kingdom: Animalia
- Phylum: Arthropoda
- Clade: Pancrustacea
- Class: Insecta
- Order: Coleoptera
- Suborder: Polyphaga
- Infraorder: Scarabaeiformia
- Family: Scarabaeidae
- Genus: Euphoresia
- Species: E. congoensis

Binomial name
- Euphoresia congoensis Moser, 1916

Species of beetle

Euphoresia congoensis is a species of beetle of the family Scarabaeidae. It is found in the Democratic Republic of the Congo.

== Description ==
Adults reach a length of about 7.5 mm. They are olive-brown. The frons is green, dull, with scales along the anterior margin and next to the middle. Next to the eyes is a dense ring of yellowish-white scales. The antennae are yellowish-brown. The pronotum is quite broadly scaled in the middle, but more densely at the sides. Three median longitudinal bands are almost scale-free and have a darker olive-green colour. The scutellum is scaled next to the margins. The elytra are striated, with the intervals weakly convex and with the scales sparsely spaced and irregular. Somewhat larger scales are found only very sporadically. A number of spots of varying sizes and irregularly arranged are darker and scaleless.
