= Euphoresia kassaiensis =

Scientific classification
- Kingdom: Animalia
- Phylum: Arthropoda
- Clade: Pancrustacea
- Class: Insecta
- Order: Coleoptera
- Suborder: Polyphaga
- Infraorder: Scarabaeiformia
- Family: Scarabaeidae
- Genus: Euphoresia
- Species: E. kassaiensis

Binomial name
- Euphoresia kassaiensis Moser, 1916

Species of beetle

Euphoresia kassaiensis is a species of beetle of the family Scarabaeidae. It is found in the Democratic Republic of the Congo.

== Description ==
Adults reach a length of about 10 mm. They are brown and dull, with the frons and pronotum green. The elytra have a greenish shimmer. The scales are yellowish-white. The antennae are reddish-brown. The pronotum is sparsely covered with oblong-ovate scales in the middle, becoming more densely covered towards the sides. The elytra are irregularly scaled in the furrows.
