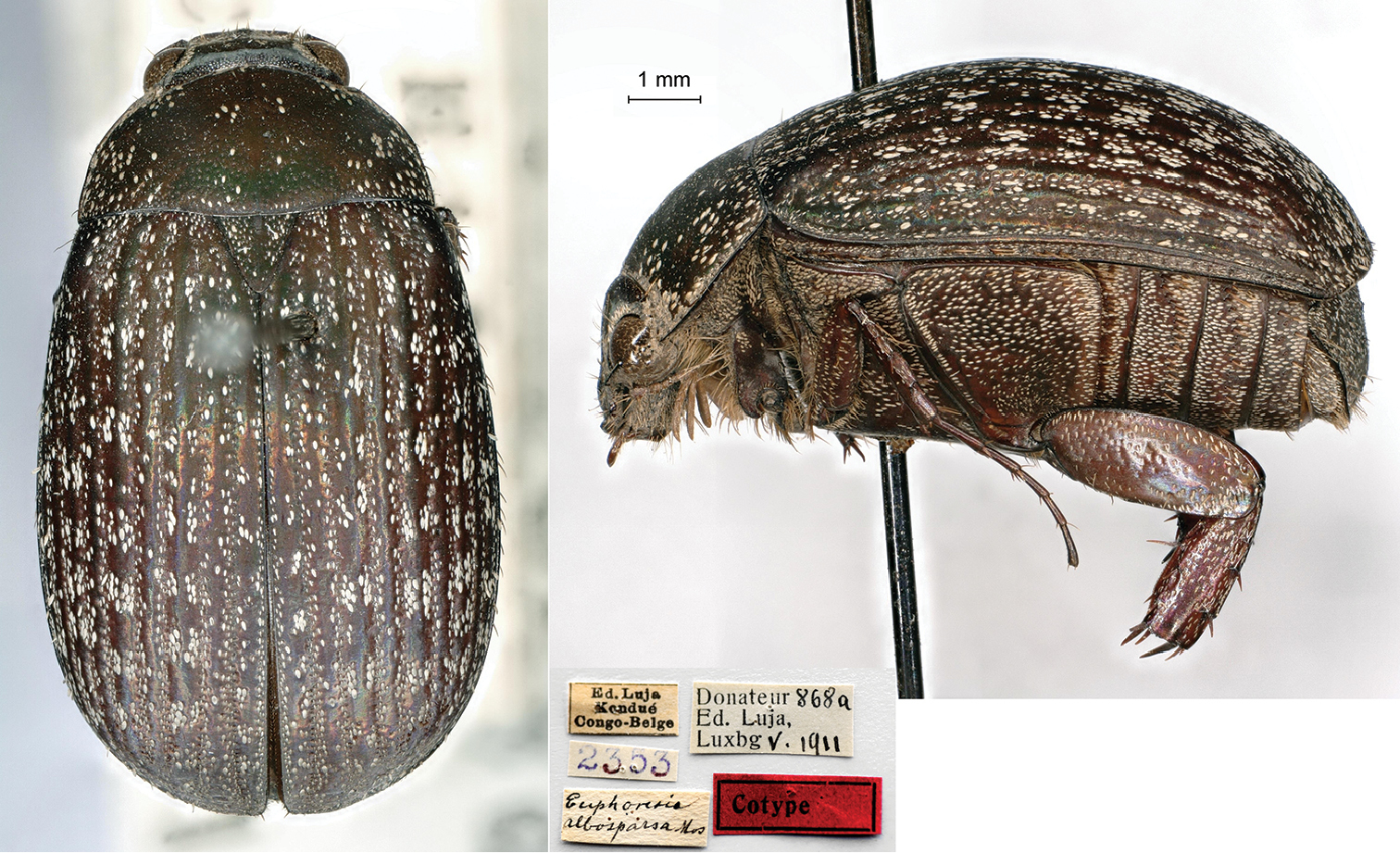

Scientific classification
- Kingdom: Animalia
- Phylum: Arthropoda
- Clade: Pancrustacea
- Class: Insecta
- Order: Coleoptera
- Suborder: Polyphaga
- Infraorder: Scarabaeiformia
- Family: Scarabaeidae
- Genus: Euphoresia
- Species: E. albosparsa

Binomial name
- Euphoresia albosparsa Moser, 1913

= Euphoresia albosparsa =

Species of beetle

Euphoresia albosparsa is a species of beetle of the family Scarabaeidae. It is found in the Democratic Republic of the Congo.

== Description ==
Adults reach a length of about 12 mm. The upper surface (except for the brown, glossy clypeus) is dirty olive-green and dull. The clypeus is strongly punctate. The punctures bear erect setae in the anterior part, and white scales are present before the clypeus suture. Apart from a ring of white scales next to the eyes, the frons shows only a few scattered scales. The pronotum is also very sparsely covered with white scales, which are almost entirely absent in the middle. The elytra are evenly ribbed and white-speckled.
