= Euphoresia warriensis =

Scientific classification
- Kingdom: Animalia
- Phylum: Arthropoda
- Class: Insecta
- Order: Coleoptera
- Suborder: Polyphaga
- Infraorder: Scarabaeiformia
- Family: Scarabaeidae
- Genus: Euphoresia
- Species: E. warriensis

Binomial name
- Euphoresia warriensis Brenske, 1901

Species of beetle

Euphoresia warriensis is a species of beetle of the family Scarabaeidae. It is found in Nigeria.

== Description ==
Adults reach a length of about 8 mm. The pronotum is sparsely scaled, especially in the middle. The elytra are distinctly ribbed, the second rib next to the suture with the most glabrous spots, which stand out clearly from the densely packed scales here. The two following ribs are less scaled in the anterior half. The other ribs are also almost scale-free in their middle, but are not very prominent. The spot on the apical hump is large and isolated. The pubescence on the underside is uniformly fine.
