= Euphoresia excellens =

Scientific classification
- Kingdom: Animalia
- Phylum: Arthropoda
- Class: Insecta
- Order: Coleoptera
- Suborder: Polyphaga
- Infraorder: Scarabaeiformia
- Family: Scarabaeidae
- Genus: Euphoresia
- Species: E. excellens

Binomial name
- Euphoresia excellens Frey, 1968

Species of beetle

Euphoresia excellens is a species of beetle of the family Scarabaeidae. It is found in the Democratic Republic of the Congo.

== Description ==
The upper and lower surfaces are reddish-brown (but the antennae are yellow) and dull, with only the clypeus slightly shiny. The pronotum and elytra have symmetrically arranged dark green spots. There is an elongated spot and on each side a larger, rounded spot at the base in the middle on the pronotum.
