= Euphoresia baliola =

Scientific classification
- Kingdom: Animalia
- Phylum: Arthropoda
- Class: Insecta
- Order: Coleoptera
- Suborder: Polyphaga
- Infraorder: Scarabaeiformia
- Family: Scarabaeidae
- Genus: Euphoresia
- Species: E. baliola

Binomial name
- Euphoresia baliola Brenske, 1901

Species of beetle

Euphoresia baliola is a species of beetle of the family Scarabaeidae. It is found in the Democratic Republic of the Congo and the Republic of the Congo.

== Description ==
Adults reach a length of about 5 mm. They are slightly metallic-shining. The frons is smooth in the middle, slightly depressed on each side, and covered with fine, scale-like hairs. The pronotum is slightly projecting forward in the middle, scarcely rounded at the sides, with fine bristles along the margin, and densely covered with small scales on the sides. The scales are very sparse and finer in the middle, and the median line is smooth. A row of small, stronger scale patches runs across the middle. The scutellum is densely scaled, except for the middle. On the elytra, the seam of the 2nd, 4th, and 6th intervals is distinctly curved, while the first, third, and fifth are almost extinguished. These latter ones are thinly covered with fine scale-like hairs, the former are interrupted by recessed groups of scales, in which individual stronger scales are also present.
