= Euphoresia varievestis =

Scientific classification
- Kingdom: Animalia
- Phylum: Arthropoda
- Clade: Pancrustacea
- Class: Insecta
- Order: Coleoptera
- Suborder: Polyphaga
- Infraorder: Scarabaeiformia
- Family: Scarabaeidae
- Genus: Euphoresia
- Species: E. varievestis

Binomial name
- Euphoresia varievestis Moser, 1916

Species of beetle

Euphoresia varievestis is a species of beetle of the family Scarabaeidae. It is found in the Democratic Republic of the Congo.

== Description ==
Adults reach a length of about 11.5 mm. They are blackish-brown and dull. The pronotum is greenish, with yellowish or whitish, narrow scales. The antennae are yellowish-brown. The pronotum is rather sparsely scaled, with a central longitudinal band and an indistinct band on either side of it. On the elytra, the scales are very irregularly arranged, forming numerous spots, while there are also unscaled patches.
