= Euphoresia insularis =

Scientific classification
- Kingdom: Animalia
- Phylum: Arthropoda
- Class: Insecta
- Order: Coleoptera
- Suborder: Polyphaga
- Infraorder: Scarabaeiformia
- Family: Scarabaeidae
- Genus: Euphoresia
- Species: E. insularis

Binomial name
- Euphoresia insularis Frey, 1960

Species of beetle

Euphoresia insularis is a species of beetle of the family Scarabaeidae. It is found in Equatorial Guinea (Bioko).

== Description ==
Adults reach a length of about 12–13 mm. The upper and lower surfaces are dark brown with yellowish scales. The upper surface is faintly shiny, while the underside is more strongly shiny. The elytra have two transverse bands. The sides of the pronotum and two small spots on the anterior disc are scaled.
