= Sphaerotrochalus brunneus =

Scientific classification
- Kingdom: Animalia
- Phylum: Arthropoda
- Clade: Pancrustacea
- Class: Insecta
- Order: Coleoptera
- Suborder: Polyphaga
- Infraorder: Scarabaeiformia
- Family: Scarabaeidae
- Genus: Sphaerotrochalus
- Species: S. brunneus

Binomial name
- Sphaerotrochalus brunneus Moser, 1924

Species of beetle

Sphaerotrochalus brunneus is a species of beetle of the family Scarabaeidae. It is found in the Democratic Republic of the Congo.

== Description ==
Adults reach a length of about 3.5 mm (0.14 in). They have an oblong-oval, brown and shiny body. The head is subrugose-punctate, with reddish-yellow antennae.
