= Sphaerotrochalus boehmi =

Scientific classification
- Kingdom: Animalia
- Phylum: Arthropoda
- Clade: Pancrustacea
- Class: Insecta
- Order: Coleoptera
- Suborder: Polyphaga
- Infraorder: Scarabaeiformia
- Family: Scarabaeidae
- Genus: Sphaerotrochalus
- Species: S. boehmi

Binomial name
- Sphaerotrochalus boehmi (Quedenfeldt, 1888)

Synonyms
- Pseudotrochalus boehmi Quedenfeldt, 1888

Species of beetle

Sphaerotrochalus boehmi is a species of beetle of the family Scarabaeidae. It is found in Tanzania.

== Description ==
Adults reach a length of about 6.5 mm. They are black, partly dull, but strongly silky-shiny above. The elytra are covered with colorful markings. They are reddish-brown, but the seam, a stripe on the middle, one next to the lateral margin and the tip are black, and the base sometimes has a fine black line, while the lateral margin is narrowly reddish-brown.
