= Euphoresia punctum =

Scientific classification
- Kingdom: Animalia
- Phylum: Arthropoda
- Class: Insecta
- Order: Coleoptera
- Suborder: Polyphaga
- Infraorder: Scarabaeiformia
- Family: Scarabaeidae
- Genus: Euphoresia
- Species: E. punctum

Binomial name
- Euphoresia punctum (Thomson, 1858)

Synonyms
- Trochalus punctum Thomson, 1858; Euphoresia punctum congoana Brenske, 1900

Species of beetle

Euphoresia punctum is a species of beetle of the family Scarabaeidae. It is found in Cameroon, Gabon and the Democratic Republic of the Congo.

== Description ==
Adults reach a length of about 8 mm. They are reddish-brown with metallic green reflections and covered with fine, white scales and with a large, velvety, ovoid, convex spot on the edge of each elytron. The elytra have fine, clearly visible striae, with the intervals slightly convex.
