= Euphoresia benitoensis =

Scientific classification
- Kingdom: Animalia
- Phylum: Arthropoda
- Class: Insecta
- Order: Coleoptera
- Suborder: Polyphaga
- Infraorder: Scarabaeiformia
- Family: Scarabaeidae
- Genus: Euphoresia
- Species: E. benitoensis

Binomial name
- Euphoresia benitoensis Brenske, 1900

Species of beetle

Euphoresia benitoensis is a species of beetle of the family Scarabaeidae. It is found in Cameroon and the Republic of the Congo.

== Description ==
Adults reach a length of about 9 mm. The pronotum is not curved at the sides but almost straight and the spots on the elytra are arranged alternately in the rows.
