= Euphoresia chiloanga =

Scientific classification
- Kingdom: Animalia
- Phylum: Arthropoda
- Class: Insecta
- Order: Coleoptera
- Suborder: Polyphaga
- Infraorder: Scarabaeiformia
- Family: Scarabaeidae
- Genus: Euphoresia
- Species: E. chiloanga

Binomial name
- Euphoresia chiloanga Brenske, 1901

Species of beetle

Euphoresia chiloanga is a species of beetle of the family Scarabaeidae. It is found in Angola.

== Description ==
Adults reach a length of about 6.5 mm. They are dark reddish-brown, dull, with dark-spotted ribs and scale patches on the elytra. The frons is dark, the yellowish scales at the suture and the eye frills stand out distinctly. The pronotum, which widens only slightly posteriorly, is very finely but unevenly covered with scales. These are concentrated in the corners, on the middle of the lateral margin, and next to the middle into small, less dense spots and are distinguished in these places by being somewhat stronger than on the rest of the densely covered middle, where they appear as punctate dots. A fine longitudinal line remains glabrous. The scutellum is equally fine and not densely scaled, so the strikingly mottled appearance is not apparent here. The elytra are distinctly striated, in the stripe with fine white scales. The ribs, especially the 2nd and 4th, are distinctly raised, with two to three dark, bare longitudinal spots between which are scaly patches.
