= Euphoresia maculiscutum =

Scientific classification
- Kingdom: Animalia
- Phylum: Arthropoda
- Class: Insecta
- Order: Coleoptera
- Suborder: Polyphaga
- Infraorder: Scarabaeiformia
- Family: Scarabaeidae
- Genus: Euphoresia
- Species: E. maculiscutum

Binomial name
- Euphoresia maculiscutum (Fairmaire, 1891)

Synonyms
- Trochalus maculiscutum Fairmaire, 1891

Species of beetle

Euphoresia maculiscutum is a species of beetle of the family Scarabaeidae. It is found in Gabon and the Democratic Republic of the Congo.

== Description ==
Adults reach a length of about 11 mm. They are brownish, with a greenish sheen above. The sides of the pronotum are curved posteriorly and the elytra have dark spots in rows. The pygidium has a heart-shaped dark mark. The underside is covered with white scales.
