= Max Quedenfeldt =

German entomologist (1851–1891)

Maximilian Friedrich Wilhelm Quedenfeldt (13 June 1851 – 18 September 1891) was a German explorer, army officer, collector, ethnographer, and naturalist. Like his father Friedrich Otto Gustav Quedenfeldt, he too had a special interest in insects and collected specimens from around the world. The lizard genus Quedenfeldtia was named in his honour by Oskar Böttger.

== Early life and career ==
Quendenfeldt was born in Großglogau in Silesia, the son of Major General Friedrich Otto Gustav Quedenfeldt and Luise Wilhelmine Amalie (1823–1896), née Meißner. He trained at the military academy in Liegnitz and joined the corps in 1866 and moved to the 7 Dragoon regiment in 1870. He saw action in the Franco-German War and was promoted to second lieutenant during the siege of Paris. In 1875 he moved to Bromberg with his regiment and in 1878 he joined the Landwehr. He then pursued his scientific interests, mainly in the pursuit of insects, followed by an interest in geography and ethnography.

He travelled to Hungary, Serbia and Bosnia from 1878 and spent time in Spain, Portugal and Morocco in 1880. He described the whistling language on the island of Gomera (1887). The Berlin Academy of Sciences sponsored a collecting visit to Morocco in 1885. In 1887 he collected in the Canary Islands. He left military service in 1888. In 1891 he visited Constantinople and went to Smyrna. Fever and ill health forced him to return and he never recovered.
