= Euphoresia bruta =

Scientific classification
- Kingdom: Animalia
- Phylum: Arthropoda
- Class: Insecta
- Order: Coleoptera
- Suborder: Polyphaga
- Infraorder: Scarabaeiformia
- Family: Scarabaeidae
- Genus: Euphoresia
- Species: E. bruta

Binomial name
- Euphoresia bruta Brenske, 1901

Species of beetle

Euphoresia bruta is a species of beetle of the family Scarabaeidae. It is found in the Republic of the Congo.

== Description ==
Adults reach a length of about 11 mm. The second, fourth and sixth ribs of the elytra are stronger than the others and marked with elongated black spots. The scales are arranged patchily in the depressed striae. On the pygidium, there is a scale-free spot on each side at the base. The underside is metallic and sparsely scaled. The upper surface is dull, while the clypeus is metallic with isolated punctures. The suture is strongly recurved, with a few scales in front of it. The frons is bare in the middle. The pronotum is elongated, only very weakly curved at the front, then quite straight, slightly widened posteriorly, with strongly projecting anterior and right-angled posterior angles. The surface is sparsely punctate and sparsely scaled, the broad middle almost entirely clear, and laterally spotted. The scales are robust. Fine scales are arranged in rows along the elytral striae, bordering the ribs and forming spots, but these only create indistinct, non-continuous transverse bands. The scutellum is scaled only at the anterior angles.
