= Euphoresia bisquamulata =

Scientific classification
- Kingdom: Animalia
- Phylum: Arthropoda
- Class: Insecta
- Order: Coleoptera
- Suborder: Polyphaga
- Infraorder: Scarabaeiformia
- Family: Scarabaeidae
- Genus: Euphoresia
- Species: E. bisquamulata

Binomial name
- Euphoresia bisquamulata Brenske, 1901

Species of beetle

Euphoresia bisquamulata is a species of beetle of the family Scarabaeidae. It is found in Cameroon and the Democratic Republic of the Congo.

== Description ==
Adults reach a length of about 7 mm. The upper and lower surfaces are very finely scaled, with scattered larger scales on the elytra. The frons has a distinct longitudinal line and fine scale-like hairs. The scales of the pronotum, whose sides are only slightly rounded anteriorly, are somewhat stronger than those of the elytra, with three glabrous longitudinal lines, and laterally somewhat more densely and patchily scaled. On the elytra, the ribs are still distinct, but weaker than in related species. They are dark cherry-red brown and have many glabrous spots which, however, are not noticeable due to their color or the lack of scales, because the scaling of the elytra is very fine. The scales are not arranged in rows within the striae and do not form conspicuous spots. The underside is thinly and finely scaled.
