= Euphoresia semnionis =

Scientific classification
- Kingdom: Animalia
- Phylum: Arthropoda
- Class: Insecta
- Order: Coleoptera
- Suborder: Polyphaga
- Infraorder: Scarabaeiformia
- Family: Scarabaeidae
- Genus: Euphoresia
- Species: E. semnionis

Binomial name
- Euphoresia semnionis Brenske, 1900

Species of beetle

Euphoresia semnionis is a species of beetle of the family Scarabaeidae. It is found in the Central African Republic and the Democratic Republic of the Congo.

== Description ==
Adults reach a length of about 9.8 mm. There are broad dark-spotted furrows on the elytra, covered with two rows of very fine white scales, which border the smooth, uniformly brown-coloured intervals, on the sides of which are larger, snow-white scales, singly or crowded into small spots.

== Subspecies ==
- Euphoresia semnionis semnionis (Central African Republic, Democratic Republic of the Congo)
- Euphoresia semnionis luluensis Burgeon, 1942 (Democratic Republic of the Congo)
- Euphoresia semnionis tinantae Burgeon, 1942 (Democratic Republic of the Congo)
