= Friedrich Otto Gustav Quedenfeldt =

German entomologist (1817-1891)

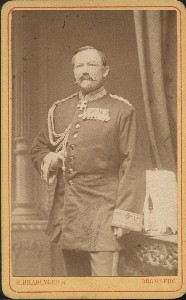
Friedrich Otto Gustav Quedenfeldt

Friedrich Otto Gustav Quedenfeldt (14 June 1817, Graudenz – 20 December 1891, Berlin) was a German entomologist who specialised in Coleoptera.

He was a Major General in the Prussian army. His son Max Quedenfeldt (13 June 1851, Glogau – 18 September 1891, Berlin), a Lieutenant in the Prussian Army, was an insect dealer who made collecting expeditions to Morocco (1880, 1883 and 1885/86), Algeria (1884), the Canary Islands (1887), Tripoli and Tunisia (1888/89) and Anatolia (Kleinasien) (1891) .

== Works ==
Partial list (father and son):

- Quedenfeldt G., 1883 Kurzer Bericht über die Ergebnisse der Reisen des H. Major a.D.v. Mechow in Angola und am Quango-Strom, nebst Aufzählung der hierbei gesammelten Longicornien.Berl. ent. Zs., 26, 2 : 317-362, 1 pl.
- Quedenfeldt G., 1883 Beschreibung von vier africanischen Longicornen.Berl. ent. Zs., 27, 1 : 143-146, 1 pl.
- Quedenfeldt G., 1883 Verzeichniss der von hern Stabsarzt Dr. Falkenstein in Chinchoxo (Westafrika, nördlich der Congomündungen) gesammelten Longicornen des Berliner Königl. Museums.Berl. ent. Zs., 27, 1 : 131-142, 1 pl
- Quedenfeldt M. 1884 Ueber einige für die Mark Brandenburg neue oder bisher in derselben selten beobachtete Käfer. Berlin. Ent. Z., Berlin, 28, str. 137–142.
- Quedenfeldt G., 1885 Cerambycidarum Africae species novae J. Sc. Lisboa, 10 : 240-247
- Quedenfeldt G., 1888 Beiträge zur Kenntniss der Koleopteren-Fauna von Central-Afrika nach den Ergebnissen der Lieutenant Wissman'schen Kassai-Expedition 1883 bis 1886 Berl. ent. Zs., 32 : 155-219

The Quedenfeldt collection of exotic beetles was sold to René Oberthür and is now in Muséum national d'Histoire naturelle in Paris. The Palearctic beetle collection was given to the Zoological Institute of the Berlin University and is now in Museum für Naturkunde in Berlin.
