= Galactic (disambiguation) =

Galactic is a funk and jazz jam band from New Orleans.

Galactic may also refer to:

- Galactic, pertaining to the Milky Way galaxy
- Galactic, pertaining to a galaxy
- Galactic, a company based in Anderlecht, Belgium, which manufactures the bioplastic polylactic acid from sugar beet
- Virgin Galactic, whose callsign is "GALACTIC"
- Galactic-class battle carrier, a class of fictional spacecraft from Star Wars
- Team Galactic, a fictional villainous team from Pokémon Diamond and Pearl, and Pokémon Platinum
- Galactic Space Alliance, a galactic polity found in Power Rangers: Lost Galaxy

== See also ==
- Galaxy (disambiguation)
- Galactic core (disambiguation)
- Galactic Center (disambiguation)
- Galactic Empire (disambiguation)
- Galactic Federation (disambiguation)
- Galactic Alliance (disambiguation)
- Galactic republic (disambiguation)
- Galaxian (disambiguation)
- Battlestar Galactica (disambiguation)
- Galactic Space Alliance, a galactic polity found in Power Rangers: Lost Galaxy
