= Galactic core =

Galactic core or galaxy core can refer to:

== Astronomy ==
- Galactic Center of the Milky Way
- Active galactic nucleus, of a regular galaxy
- Bulge (astronomy), the core of spiral galaxies in general
- Central massive object, the mass concentration at the center of a galaxy
- Supermassive black hole, the core of most galaxies

== Smartphones ==
- Samsung Galaxy Core
- Samsung Galaxy Core Advance
- Samsung Galaxy Core LTE

== Other ==
- A computer video game developed by Spiderweb Software

== See also ==
- Galactic Center (disambiguation)
