= Galactic Alliance =

A Galactic Alliance is a galactic polity spanning part or all of a galaxy.

It may refer to:

- Galactic Federation of Free Alliances (a.k.a. Galactic Alliance), a Star Wars Expanded Universe Legends-timeline polity, that follows after the destruction of the New Republic
- Pan Galactic Alliance, a galactic polity found in Teenage Mutant Ninja Turtles (2003 TV series)
- Galactic Alliance, the commanding polity of Star Command, in the Pixar property Buzz Lightyear of Star Command
- Galactic Alliance, a fictional alien polity found in the Disney franchise Lilo & Stitch (franchise)
- Galactic Alliance, a humankind polity found in the anime series Gargantia on the Verdurous Planet
- Galactic Alliance, a multi-galaxy polity found in and setting of the SF RPG Battlelords of the 23rd Century
- Galactic Space Alliance, a galactic polity found in Power Rangers: Lost Galaxy

== See also ==
- List of fictional galactic communities
- Galactic Republic Alliance, a fictional polity from the tokusatsu TV show Ultraman 80, see List of Ultraman 80 characters
- Alliance (disambiguation)
- Galactic (disambiguation)
- Galactic Empire (disambiguation)
- Galactic Federation (disambiguation)
- Galactic republic (disambiguation)
