= Yurian =

Yurian can refer to several fictional items:

- Julian (ユリアン, Yurian), former slave in the web manga Centuria
- Yurian Stonebow, in The Wheel of Time
- Yulian (ユリアン, Yurian), one of the Ultra Warriors in Mega Monster Battle; see List of Mega Monster Battle characters#Other Showa Ultras
- Yurian, a kind of fictional monster; see List of Dungeons & Dragons 3rd edition monsters#WTC 88661 – Fiend Folio (2003)
- Yullian (ユリアン, Yurian), a character in Ultraman 80; see List of Ultraman 80 characters#Yullian
