= Galactic republic =

A galactic republic is a republic that spans most of a galaxy. It may refer to:

- Galactic Republic, in Star Wars, the Old Republic, the New Republic
- Galactic Republic, a fictional polity in the 1953 comic book story "Judgment Day", that was controversially a target of censorship in 1956
- Galactic Republic, a fictional polity from the Japanese anime OAV series Legend of Galactic Heroes, see List of Legend of the Galactic Heroes episodes

== See also ==
- List of fictional galactic communities
- Galactic Republic Alliance, a fictional polity from the tokusatsu TV show Ultraman 80, see List of Ultraman 80 characters
- Republic (disambiguation)
- Galactic (disambiguation)
- Galactic Alliance (disambiguation)
- Galactic Empire (disambiguation)
- Galactic Federation (disambiguation)
