= List of fictional galactic communities =

This is a list of fictional galactic communities who are space-faring, in contact with one or more space-faring civilizations or are part of a larger government, coalition, republic, organization or alliance of two or more separate space-faring civilizations. They may be large galactic polities, or smaller ones. In ufology and some New Age religions there are claims and speculations of the existence of a Galactic Federation, but no evidence has ever been presented to prove its existence beyond an imaginary concept.

== Television ==
=== Stargate ===
- Alliance of the Four Great Races
- Ancient Domain
- Ori Domain
- United Nations of Earth
- Free Jaffa Nation
- Goa'uld Empire
- Goa'uld Remnants
- Lucian Alliance
- Coalition of Planets

=== Star Trek ===
- Borg Collective
- Breen Confederacy
- Cardassian Union
- Dominion
- Ferengi Alliance
- Gorn Hegemony
- Klingon Empire
- Romulan Star Empire
- Klingon-Cardassian Alliance
- Terran Empire
- United Federation of Planets

=== Foundation (Asimoverse) ===
- Galactic Empire (Foundation)
- Foundation (Foundation)

=== Star Wars ===
- Galactic Empire
- Galactic Republic
- Rebel Alliance
- Resistance
- Confederacy of Independent Systems
- Infinite Empire
- Hutt Empire
- New Republic
- First Order
- Chiss Ascendancy

== Films ==
=== DC ===
- Green Lantern Corps (DCEU)

=== Star Wars ===
- Galactic Empire
- Galactic Republic
- Resistance
- Confederacy of Independent Systems
- New Republic
- First Order

=== Star Trek ===
- Breen Confederacy
- Cardassian Union
- Dominion
- Ferengi Alliance
- Gorn Hegemony
- Klingon Empire
- Romulan Star Empire
- Klingon-Cardassian Alliance
- Terran Empire
- United Federation of Planets

== Video games ==
=== Halo ===
- The Covenant
- UNSC

=== Warhammer 40,000 ===
- Imperium of Man
- Tau Empire
- Chaos Space Marines
- Dark Eldar
- Tyranids
- Necrons

=== ConSentiency ===
- The ConSentiency universe (Frank Herbert's The Dosadi Experiment)

=== Marathon ===
- Pfhor (Marathon)

=== Half-Life ===
- The Combine

== Animated television ==
- Democratic Order Of Planets (Futurama)
- Green Lantern Corps (DCAU)
- Heralds of Galactus (MAU)
- Shadow Galactica (Sailor Moon)

== Animated films ==
- Green Lantern Corps (DCAMU)
- Kree Empire (MAF)
- Galactic Alliance (Lightyear)
- Terran Empire (Treasure Planet)
- United Galactic Federation (Lilo & Stitch)

== Literature ==
=== BattleTech ===
- Capellan Confederation

=== Lensman ===
- Galactic Patrol (Lensman)

=== Dune ===
- Corrino Empire
- Atreides Empire

=== Foundation ===
- Galactic Empire (Foundation)

== Comic books ==
=== Hasbro Comic Book Universe (HCBU) ===
==== Transformers ====
- Autobot Commonwealth
- Decepticon Empire
- Maximal Commonwealth
- Predacon Empire
- Quintesson Pan Galactic Co-Prosperity Sphere

==== Visionaries ====
- Prysmosian Commonwealth
- Spectral Knights
- Darking Lords

==== other ====
- Peaceful Nations Alliance
- Homeworld Defence Force

=== DC Comic Book Universe ===
- Green Lantern Corps (DCU)

=== Marvel Comic Book Universe ===
- Nova Corps (MU)
- Kree Empire
- Shi'ar Empire
- Heralds of Galactus

== See also ==
- Astropolitics
- Galactic Alliances
- Galactic Empires
- Galactic Federations
- Galactic Republics
