= Galactic Federation =

Galactic Federation may refer to:

== Fictional entities ==
=== Film and television ===
- Galactic Federation in the Doctor Who serials The Curse of Peladon and The Monster of Peladon
- Galactic Federation in Rick and Morty episodes
- Galactic Federation in Lilo & Stitch
- Galactic Federation in The Tomorrow People TV series
- Galactic Federation in Please Teacher! anime TV series
- Galactic Federation of Free Alliances, a rebirth of the New Republic (Star Wars)
- Galactic Federation in Shingu: Secret of the Stellar Wars TV series
- United Federation of Planets, in Star Trek

=== Gaming ===
- Galactic Federation in the Metroid video game series
- Galactic Federation in the Infinite Space video game
- Galactic Federation in the Time Traveler video game
- Galactic Federation in The Rings of Kether roleplaying gamebook
- Galactic Federation in the Gun-Nac video game
- Galactic Federation in Star Hero roleplaying game
- Galactic Federation in the Elite Dangerous video game
- Galactic Federation in the FTL: Faster Than Light video game

=== Literature ===
- Galactic Federation in the Legacy of the Aldenata universe
- Galactic Federation in The Excalibur Alternative by David Weber
- Galactic Federation in The Hazing by Isaac Asimov
- Galactic Federation in Planet of Light by Raymond F. Jones
- Galactic Federation in Legend of the Galactic Heroes by Yoshiki Tanaka
- Galactic Federation in The Angry Espers by Lloyd Biggle Jr.
- Galactic Federation in the Einai series of books by Simon Lang
- Galactic Federation in the Sector General series of books by James White
- Galactic Federation in the Maschinen Krieger ZbV 3000 universe
- Galactic Federation in The Amazing 3 manga
- Galactic Federation in the books of Pierre Barbet

== Ufology ==
- Galactic Federation, a supposed alliance of extraterrestrial civilizations within the Milky Way:
  - a claimed body of the Ground Crew Project religion
  - a claimed intra-galactic governing or supervising body cited by Haim Eshed

== See also ==
- List of fictional galactic communities
- Galactic Alliance (disambiguation)
- Galactic Empire (disambiguation)
- Galactic republic (disambiguation)
- Galactic Republic in the Star Wars universe
- United Federation of Planets in the Star Trek universe
