= Maschinen Krieger ZbV 3000 =

Science fiction franchise by Kow Yokoyama

Maschinen Krieger (Ma.K ZBV3000), often abbreviated as Ma.K., is a science fiction intellectual property created by Japanese artist and sculptor Kow Yokoyama in the 1980s. It consists of an illustrated series, a line of merchandise comprising display and action figures of mecha characters and a 1985 short film.

== History ==
The franchise originally began as the science fiction series SF3D which ran as monthly installments in the Japanese hobby magazine Hobby Japan from 1982 to 1985. To develop the storyline, Kow Yokoyama collaborated with Hiroshi Ichimura as story editor and Kunitaka Imai as graphic designer. The three creators drew visual inspiration from their combined interest in World War I and World War II armor and aircraft, the American space program and films such as Star Wars, Blade Runner and The Road Warrior. Inspired by the ILM model builders who worked on Star Wars, Yokoyama built the original models from numerous kits including armor, aircraft, and automobiles. He mostly concentrated on powered armor suits, but later included bipedal walking tanks and aircraft with anti-gravity systems.

In 1986, there was a dispute with Hobby Japan over the copyright of the series. The magazine dropped SF3D from its line-up of articles and Nitto ceased production of various kits of the series. The matter was tied up in the courts for years until Yokoyama was awarded the full copyright to the series in the 1990s. Yokoyama and Hobby Japan eventually reconciled and restarted their working relationship, ditching the old SF3D name in favor of Maschinen Krieger ZbV3000, otherwise known as Ma.K.

== Story ==
A nuclear World War IV in 2807 kills most of Earth's population and renders the planet uninhabitable. Fifty-two years after the war, a research team from an interstellar union called the Galactic Federation is sent to Earth and discovers that the planet's natural environment has restored itself. The Federation decides to repopulate the planet and sends over colonists to the surface. Cities and towns are eventually reformed over the next 20 years, but this growth attracts the attention of criminals, military deserters, and other lawless elements who wanted to hide on Earth—away from the authorities. A few militias protect the colonists, but the new interlopers often defeat them.

Fearing civil unrest and the colonists forming their own government, the Federation gives the Strahl Democratic Republic (SDR) the right to govern the planet in the late 2870s. The SDR sends three police battalions and three Foreign Legion corps to Earth and uses heavy-handed tactics such as travel restrictions and hard labor camps to restore order, which creates resentment amongst the colonists. In response, the colonists create the Earth Independent Provisional Government and declare independence from the SDR. The SDR immediately establishes a puppet government and attempts to quell the uprising. The wealthy colonists hire mercenaries who are descendants of WWIV veterans to form the Independent Mercenary Army (IMA), which is bolstered by the presence of SDR Foreign Legion defectors. They attack the SDR forces and the battle to control Earth begins in 2882.

Over the next four years, the SDR and IMA fight each other at several locations worldwide while developing new technology along the way. The war turns up a notch in June 2883 when the IMA deploys a new weapon - the Armored Fighting Suit powered armor - to devastating effect. The SDR eventually builds their own AFS units.

In the last SF3D installment published in the December 1986 issue of Hobby Japan, the IMA successfully defeats the new SDR Königs Kröte unmanned command-and-control mecha using a computer virus that also creates a new artificial intelligence system on the moon.

== Merchandise ==
=== Model kits ===
Fan interest from the installments in Hobby Japan resulted in a small Japanese model company, Nitto, securing the license and quickly released 21 injection molded kits from the series during its entire run in the magazine. Most of the Nitto model kits are in 1:20 scale, while others were made in 1:76 and 1:6 scale. Production of the kits stopped with the end of the Hobby Japan features in 1986, but Nitto reissued many of the original kits under the Maschinen Krieger name, albeit with new decals and box art. Some of the original Nitto kits such as the Krachenvogel are highly sought after by collectors. The Nitto models were also the basis for similar offerings from Japanese model companies Wave and ModelKasten. Wave, in particular, is currently producing original-tooled kits of various subjects in the franchise, such as the Armored Fighting Suits powered armor. Smaller companies such as Brick Works and Love Love Garden have made limited resin pilot figures to go with these model kits.

At the 2008 Nuremberg Toy Fair in Germany, the Hasegawa company - known mostly for its line of military and civilian vehicles — announced plans to carry the Ma.K license, having successfully branched into pop culture franchises such as Macross. Hasegawa's venture into the franchise came with the release of the Pkf 85 Falke attack craft in March 2009. The company's Ma.K line has since expanded to at least ten kits either 1:35 or 1:20 scale, including a 1:35 Scale Nutrocker tank and the Mk44 humanoid mecha suit from Robot Battle V, a sidestory to the franchise. Wave corporation also has a line of 1/20 models. While Hasegawa largely maintained the yellow-box aesthetic from the older nitto kits, Wave has a more colorful box design.

Certain garage kit manufacturers such as Rainbow-Egg are allowed to produce their own line of resin kits and accessories, upon securing special authorization from Yokoyama himself.

=== Toys ===
The franchise also contains a line of action and display figures. The Japanese hobby shop and toy company Yellow Submarine and garage kit maker Max Factory released several pre-finished figures in 1:35 and 1:16 scale. MediCom Toys included Chibi Ma.K. figures in their Kubrick line, plus two 1:6 SAFS figures with working lights and fully poseable pilot figures.

=== Books ===
Numerous sourcebooks and modeling guides that further flesh out the information in the series have been released. Hobby Japan published a compilation of the first 15 SF3D installments in 1983 and reprinted them in March 2010. Eventually, the magazine re-released all 43 installments in a slipcase compilation called "SF3D Chronicles" in August 2010, which organized the installments into two separate books: "Heaven" featuring articles on aerial models, and "Earth" for ground-based models.

Model Graphix followed suit with their own line of sourcebooks, which provide tutorials from Yokoyama on how he makes his figures. Some sourcebooks also have custom decal sets.

=== Miniature wargaming ===
In 2019, Slave 2 Gaming gained the license to produce and sell 1:100 scale (15mm) metal and resin war gaming miniatures. This new range of Maschinen Krieger figures was given the name Ma.K in 15mm, so as to not complicate sales with customers, and rebrand the Ma.k name for the miniature wargaming world.

The figures are designed and cast in Australia. They are sold exclusively through Slave 2 Gaming at this time due to the license agreement with Sensei Yokoyama. With the production of the miniatures, a set of gaming rules in the works, with the plan is to release all the current Maschinen Krieger models.

== Short film ==
Yokoyama collaborated with Tsuburaya Productions to create a live-action SF3D film using miniatures in 1985. Directed by Shinichi Ohoka from a script penned by co-producer Hisao Ichikura, the 25-minute SF3D Original Video opens with wreckage left from a battle in the Wiltshire wastelands on Christmas Day 2884 before focusing on a badly damaged IMA SAFS unit. The pilot, Cpl Robert Bush (Tristan Hickey), who is still alive, seeks to get his armored suit back and running and leave the battle area, which is under heavy jamming. Seeing two of the SDR's new Nutrocker (Nutcracker) robot hovertanks arrive nearby, Bush tries to hide, but bodily functions give him away. One Nutcracker gives chase and the SAFS AI points out to Bush how to defeat it. He eventually clambers on to the tank, which passes through the rubble of a town and randomly shoots at high places to bring down objects that could snag him. With the SAFS' right arm sheared off by the Nutcracker's laser blasts and snow settling in, Bush is knocked unconscious all night long from the fall while the tank breaks down under the cold. The next day, the SAFS AI wakes up Bush because the Nutcracker is active again and is preparing to kill him. Bush gets up and faces the tank as it charges towards him. However, the Nutcracker gets too close to a cliff that buckles under its weight and Bush fires his laser into the tank's underbelly. The tank plunges into a ravine and explodes. Bush walks away and reestablishes radio contact with his base. It is revealed that the battle was a field test of the SAFS, Bush's machine being the only survivor out of four deployed that day.

After the end credits roll, two other Nutcrackers arrive at the scene of the battle.

== Feature film ==
In September 2017, It producer Roy Lee announced that a Hollywood film version of Maschinen Krieger is in development, under the title Ma.K. Among the co-producers will be creator Yokoyama himself as well as TMNT director Kevin Munroe, who remarked, "Kow is a world creator in the truest sense, and this project finally gives Ma.K a global audience who will experience this epic and rich sci-fi property as fans have for the last 35 years."
