= Galactic Center (disambiguation) =

Galactic Center may refer to

- Galactic Center, the rotational center of the Milky Way galaxy
- The Galactic Center Saga, a series of books

== See also ==
- Galactic anticenter
- Galactic core (disambiguation)
