= Samsung Galaxy Core LTE =

Smartphone

- Manufacturer: Samsung Electronics
- Type: Touchscreen smartphone
- First released: May 2014; 12 years ago
- Compatible networks: (GSM/GPRS/EDGE): 850, 900, 1800 and 1900 MHz; 3G (HSDPA 42.2 Mbit/s, HSUPA 5.76 Mbit/s): 850, 900, and 2100 MHz; LTE: 800, 1800 and 2600 MHz
- Form factor: Slate
- Dimensions: 132.9 mm (5.23 in) H 66.3 mm (2.61 in) W 9.8 mm (0.39 in) D
- Weight: 137 g (4.8 oz)
- Operating system: Android 4.2.2 "Jelly Bean"
- CPU: 1.2 GHz dual-core CPU
- Memory: 1 GB RAM
- Storage: 8 GB
- Removable storage: microSD, up to 64 GB
- Battery: 2100 mAh Li-ion
- Rear camera: 5 megapixels with LED flash
- Front camera: VGA, 640x480
- Display: 4.5 in (110 mm) 960×540 px PLS (245 ppi)
- Connectivity: List: Wi-Fi :802.11 b/g/n; Wi-Fi Direct; Wi-Fi hotspot; DLNA; GPS/GLONASS; NFC; Bluetooth 4.0; USB 2.0 (Micro-B port, USB charging) USB OTG; 3.50 mm (0.138 in) headphone jack
- Data inputs: Accelerometer; Proximity sensor Compass

The Samsung Galaxy Core LTE is an Android smartphone designed, developed, and marketed by Samsung Electronics. Announced at the 2014 Mobile World Congress in Barcelona, Spain, the Galaxy Core LTE features a 4.5 in (110 mm) diagonal qHD display, 4G LTE connectivity and Android 4.2.2 Jelly Bean.
