= Galactic Empire (disambiguation) =

A galactic empire is a common trope used in science fantasy and science fiction.

The Galactic Empire is a fictional autocracy in the Star Wars franchise.

Galactic Empire or Galactic Empires may also refer to:

== Fictional entities ==
- Galactic Empire (Isaac Asimov), in Isaac Asimov's books
- Galactic Empire (LOGH), in Legend of the Galactic Heroes
- Corrino Empire, in Frank Herbert's books

== Literature ==
- Galactic Empire series, three novels by Isaac Asimov
- Galactic Empires (anthology), six novellas edited by Gardner Dozois, 2008
- Corrino Empire, six novels by Frank Herbert

== Games ==
- Galactic Empire (1980 video game), for the TRS-80
- Galactic Empire (1990 video game), for the Amiga and MS-DOS
- Galactic Empire for The Major BBS bulletin board
- Galactic Empires, a collectible card game
- Galactic Empires (game), a space-based play-by-mail wargame

== See also ==
- List of fictional galactic communities
- Galactic Alliance (disambiguation)
- Galactic Federation (disambiguation)
- Galactic republic (disambiguation)
