= Samsung Galaxy Core Advance =

2014 Android smartphone

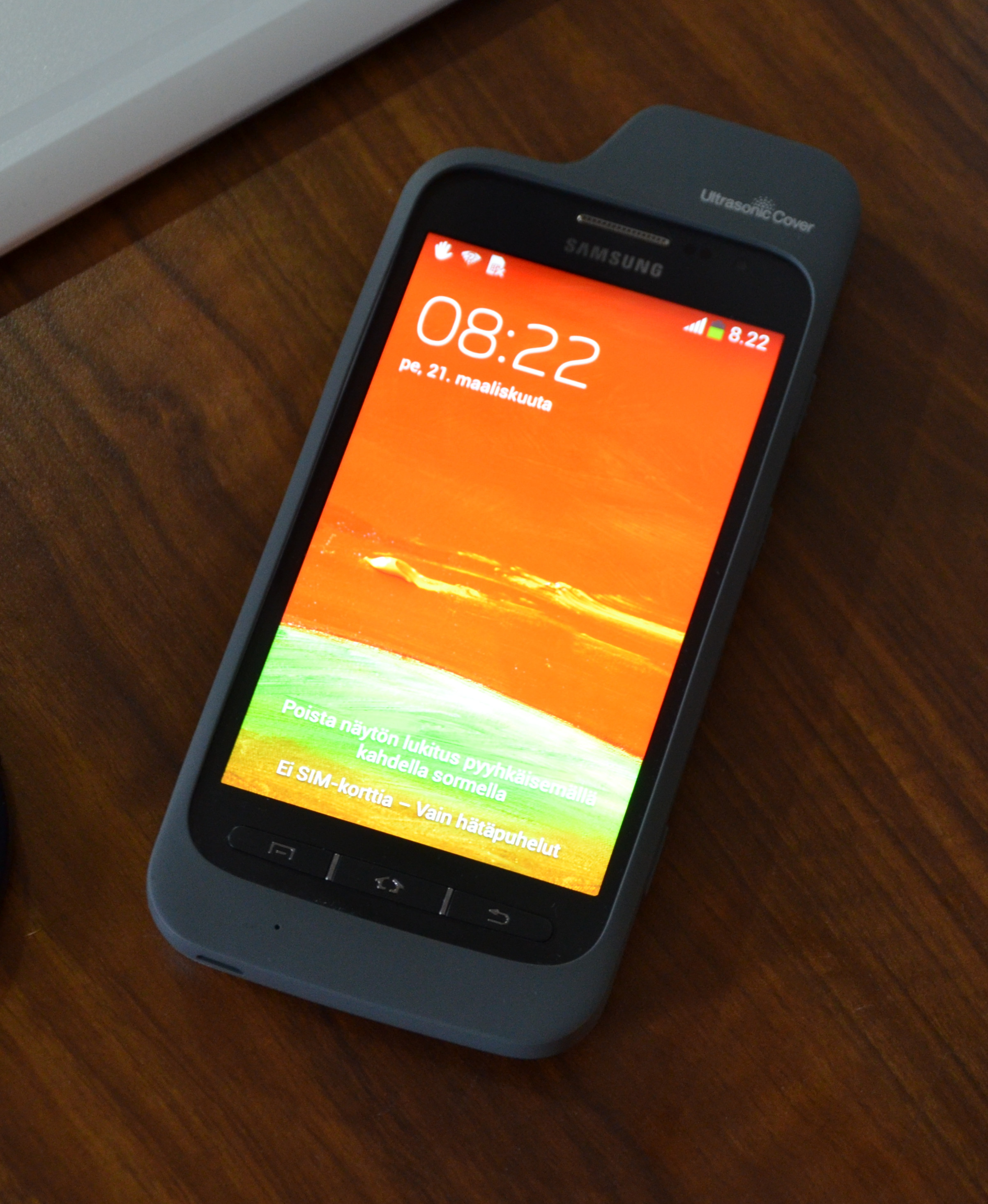
- Galaxy Core Advance with Ultrasonic Cover
- Manufacturer: Samsung Electronics
- Type: Touchscreen smartphone
- Related: Samsung Galaxy S III; Samsung Galaxy S II
- Form factor: Slate
- Operating system: Android Jelly Bean 4.2
- CPU: 1.2 GHz dual-core CPU
- Memory: 1 GB RAM
- Battery: 2,000 mAh
- Rear camera: 5 MP with LED flash
- Display: 4.70 in (119 mm) diagonal TFT 800×400 px (199 ppi)

The Samsung Galaxy Core Advance is an Android smartphone designed, developed, and marketed by Samsung Electronics. Announced on 16 December 2013, the Galaxy Core Advance features a 4.70 in (119 mm) diagonal TFT display with 800x400 resolution and Android Jelly Bean 4.2. The phone was scheduled to be released in 2014.
