= List of Ultraman 80 characters =

This is a list of characters for the 1980 Ultra Series Ultraman 80. Following the end of 1979–80 anime The Ultraman, 80 was introduced as a sequel to the mainstream Showa era Ultra Series through its continuation from 5 years since the finale of Ultraman Leo.

== Ultras ==
=== Ultraman 80 ===
Ultraman 80 (left) with Yullian (right) as seen in the final episode.

Ultraman 80 (ウルトラマン80, Urutoraman Eiti) is the eponymous protagonist of the series, an Ultra Brothers (ウルトラ兄弟, Urutora Kyōdai) candidate from Land of Light who was sent to Earth five years following Ultraman Leo's final fight. Realizing that monster attacks were related to Minus Energy emissions from humans, 80 assumed the form of Takeshi Yamato (矢的 猛, Yamato Takeshi) and worked as a science teacher in Sakuragaoka Middle School to teach children about love and courage. On the first day as a teacher, Takeshi's quick detection of the monster Crescent led to Ōyama recruiting him into the ranks of UGM after discussing the matters with the principal. From that day on, Takeshi led a triple life as either a schoolteacher on weekdays, UGM officer in weekends and after school and as Ultraman 80 when fighting monsters. As the battle against monsters became more intense, Takeshi was forced to quit teaching at Sakuragaoka Middle School and became a full-time UGM member. In the final episodes of his series, he received assistance from his childhood friend Yullian and the two finally return to the Land of Light once the final monster, Margodon, was defeated by UGM themselves. By the time he returned to the Land of Light, 80 was officially recruited as a member of the Ultra Brothers.

Since Takeshi was an Ultraman disguised as a human, he retained his enhanced sense of vision that allowed him to perceive a monster's presence. Takeshi's true form as Ultraman 80 was a secret he obligated to protect, especially during transformations since being discovered by Earthlings would lead to his immediate return to the Land of Light. Using the Bright Stick (ブライトスティック, Buraito Sutikku), Takeshi can either transform into Ultraman 80, expose disguised aliens or summon a barrier which he used against Gymaira. As Ultraman 80, he fights with the use of acrobatic movements and ray beams. His finishing moves are the Succium Beam (サクシウム光線, Sakushiumu Kōsen), Buckle Beam (バックルビーム, Bakkuru Bīmu) and Moonsault Kick (ムーンサルトキック, Mūnsaruto Kikku).

Takeshi Yamato was portrayed by Hatsunori Hasegawa (長谷川 初範, Hasegawa Hatsunori), who received the offer for the role by Tsuburaya's then-producer Kazuho Mitsuda. Hatsunori liked the show's first cour which focused on Takeshi as a teacher and regretted that said plot ended early. Ultraman 80 on the other hand was designed by Osamu Yamaguchi.

=== Yullian ===
Yullian (ユリアン, Yurian; 43-50) is the royal princess from the Land of Light, Nebula M78 and Ultraman 80's childhood friend. At some point in the duration of 80's time on Earth, the Land of Light countered the invasion force led by King Galtan. Yullian went to Earth to personally warn 80 but a chain of events accidentally led to Emi's death. Since then, she adopted a human form Ryōko Hoshi (星 涼子, Hoshi Ryōko), named by Ōyama and replace Emi to make up her mistakes. Although usually supporting 80, Takeshi had her remained as a human and wished to reserve her role as an Ultra in the event of his defeat but she transformed once to help him fight against Pluzuma and Minuzuma. At the end of the episode, Takeshi and Ryōko celebrated their final day on Earth before departing to the Land of Light.

Even in her human form, Ryōko can still use her Princess Ray (プリンセスレイ, Purinsesu Rei) attack and utilize the Medical Gun (メディカルガン, Medikaru Gan) healing pistol. She transforms into Yullian using the Bright Bracelet (ブライトブレスレット, Buraito Buresuretto). As Yullian, she is capable of performing various superhuman feats, but her sole attack was Double Power (ダブルパワー, Daburu Pawā) rotation attack with 80.

Ryōko Hoshi is portrayed by Sayoko Hagiwara (萩原 佐代子, Hagiwara Sayoko).

=== Inter-Galactic Defense Force ===
- Father of Ultra (ウルトラの父, Urutora no Chichi; 38): Commander of the Inter-Galactic Defense Force that first appeared in Ultraman Ace. In episode 38, the Father of Ultra telepathically encourage Yamato after he was weakened from Gosedon's attack.

== UGM/UNDA ==
The Utility Government Members (ユーティリティガバメントメンバーズ, Yūtiriti Gabamento Menbāzu), abbreviated as UGM (ユージーエム, Yū Jī Emu), is a monster and strange phenomenon investigation team under the Earth Defense Force UNDA (地球防衛軍UNDA, Chikyū Bōei-gun Unda; United Nations Defence Army), the latter founded by the United Nations to overseer armies across the world. In addition to various branch across the Earth, it also had its base on the Moon.

In the series' UGM took residence in UNDA's Far East Area Base (極東エリア基地, Kyokutō Eria Kichi) in Atsugi, Kanagawa Prefecture. The base was partially destroyed by Zarudon in episode 14 and was relocated to another facility in the second half of the series. According to episode 25's narration, there were a total of 2,000 UNDA members with 30% of the staffs consist of women. As episode 12 concluded the "Academy Chapter", episodes 13 until 30 were regarded as UGM Chapter (UGM編, Yū Jī Emu hen).

=== Members ===
UGM

- Kazuki Ōyama (オオヤマ 一樹, Ōyama Kazuki): The team leader of UGM, Ōyama is the most experienced out of the officers as he had been fighting against monsters during the previous Ultra Brothers' era. After witnessing Takeshi's intuition of sensing Crescent despite dismissal from others, Ōyama negotiated with principal Hayashi for Takeshi's induction into UGM while still maintaining his job as a teacher. He was also responsible for giving Yullian a human name while recuperating on Earth. In the final episode, Ōyama revealed to Takeshi that he is well aware of the latter's double life as 80 and instead sent his other team members to defeat Margodon in order to prove mankind's reliability in self-defense. He was portrayed by Jin Nakayama (中山 仁, Nakayama Jin).
- Junkichi Itō (イトウ 順吉, Itō Junkichi; 14-50): UGM's recent sub-captain following his debut in episode 14, usually called by the other members as Chief Itō. He was Ōyama's colleague in their younger years and previously worked in UGM's Europe branch. In order to track Zarudon, Itō studied teleportation and arranged to be transferred to the Japanese branch as their sub-captain. Initially mistaken as an alien, he was properly greeted by the team members once Zarudon was defeated. Alongside Captain Ōyama, Ito is also well aware of Takeshi's true identity in the final episode. He is portrayed by Masaaki Daimon (大門 正明, Daimon Masaaki).
  - Human Monster Lavras (人間怪獣 ラブラス, Ningen Kaijū Raburasu; 17, 18): During his reunion with Sawako Hoshi in Shiokaze Island, Itō was transformed into a monster by Gymaira's Monster Changing Ray. The transformation remained so long as Lavras was still alive. As with other victims of Gymaira, Lavras also fell under the thrall of Gymaira and was forced to fight against 80 with the similarly-enslaved Daron. Using his remaining willpower, Lavras wrestled himself out of Gymaira's control and rescued 80 before retreating. The still-injured Lavras sacrificed itself to save 80, reverting to Itō at the time of his death. However, the sub-captain was revived when his fiancée Sawako sacrificed her life in the process.
- Tokihiko Harada (ハラダ 時彦, Harada Tokihiko; 1-26, 50): Aged 26 years old and the first sub-captain before Ito's arrival. He is a former boxer and is said to have many siblings. Alongside Tajima, the two were transferred to the Australian branch in episode 27 but returned in the final episode just in time to aid UGM in their fight against Margodon and celebrating Takeshi and Ryōko's departure from Earth. He is portrayed by Daisuke Musō (無双 大介, Musō Daisuke).
- Hiroshi Tajima (タジマ 浩, Tajima Hiroshi; 1-26, 50): Aged 23 and the team's marksman expert. He is usually assigned with Harada, as the two were transferred to the Australian branch in episode 27 but returned in the final episode. He is portrayed by Shūhei Nitta (新田 修平, Nitta Shūhei).
- Emi Jōno (城野 エミ, Jō'no Emi; 1-43): The 20-year-old daughter of Professor Jōno from Hokkaido. Since UGM has very few female workers, Emi dreams to become the female captain of the female only team in UGM's Paris branch. Although usually worked as an operator, there were few occasions where she would participate in the field. During Yullian's arrival on Earth, Emi was mistaken as the disguised princess of Planet Ultra by Alien Galagala and King Galtan, being kidnapped as a leverage on Takeshi and was impaled by a lance while trying to protect him. In her dying breath, Emi told Yullian to assume her place in UGM. She is portrayed by Eri Ishida (石田 えり, Ishida Eri).
- Shinhachirō Fujimori (フジモリ 新八郎, Fujimori Shinhachirō; 27-50): A UGM officer introduced in the show's third cour, usually went on missions alongside fellow rookie Ikeda. He is portrayed by Masashi Furuta (古田 正志, Furuta Masashi).
- Noboru Ikeda (イケダ 登, Ikeda Noboru; 27-50): A UGM officer known for piloting all models of aircraft at the team's disposal. Like Fujimori, he is a rookie member introduced in the series' third cour and looked up to Takeshi as a senior. He is portrayed by Tatsuya Okamoto (岡本 達哉, Okamoto Tatsuya).
- Teruo Sera (セラ 照夫, Sera Teruo; 15-50): UGM's public relation officer. His absence until episode 15 was revealed to be a result of exploring the outer space using a Space Mammy until his return. Outside of working hours, Sera is in fact a tutor of a Sumo club participated by university students. He is portrayed by Akihiko Sugisaki (杉崎 昭彦, Sugisaki Akihiko).
- Yuriko Kosaka (小坂 ユリ子, Kosaka Yuriko; 21-50): A UGM meteorology group member that appeared from Episode 21, she shares an identical appearance with Sakuragaoka Middle School staff Non-chan. She is portrayed by Noriko Shirasaka (白坂 紀子, Shirasaka Noriko).
- Android Emi (アンドロイド・エミ, Andoroido Emi; 50): A gynoid built under the likeness of the deceased Emi Jōno. As with the original, she is portrayed by Eri Ishida.

UNDA

- Secretary Nangou (ナンゴウ長官, Nangō chōkan): The secretary of UNDA who sees the potential of UGM's Japan branch. He is portrayed by Yoshirō Kitahara (北原 義郎, Kitahara Yoshirō).

=== Mechas and vehicles ===
- Sky Higher (スカイハイヤー, Sukai Haiyā): A single seater VTOL with the ability to analyze monsters. It also had an unseen tank form.
- Silver Gull (シルバーガル, Shirubā Garu): An aircraft with the ability to split into two separate components, Alpha and Beta. During the battle against Saramandora, Yamato created the Formation Yamato (フォーメーション・ヤマト, Fōmēshon Yamato) by having jet separated; the first one act as a diversion while the other targeted its weak point.
- Space Mammy (スペースマミー, Supēsu Mamī): Originally a space-exploration mother ship which Sera and other crew members rode for their 6 months exploration in Monster Graveyard before their return in episode 15. Since then, the Space Mammy served as a mother ship to deploy Sky Higher and Silver Gull during mid-combat.
- Earth Defense Force Fighter (地球防衛軍戦闘機, Chikyū Bōei-gun Sentōki): UNDA's regular combat aircraft deployed as supports for UGM.
- Ace Flyer (エースフライヤー, Ēsu Furaiyā): Chief Itō's fighter during his debut in episode 14.
- Douglas A-4 Skyhawk: Rode by Harada and Tajima during their return in the final episode to assist UGM by refueling Captain Ōyama's Sky Higher.
- Scouter S7 (スカウターS7, Sukautā Esu Sebun): UGM's main patrol car of the base model Mazda RX-7.

== Sakuragaoka Middle School ==
The Sakuragaoka Middle School (桜ヶ丘中学校, Sakuragaoka Chūgakkō) is a Japanese middle school and was the original setting in the first cour of Ultraman 80, hence its name as Academy Chapter (学園編, Gakuen-hen). According to screenwriter Shigemitsu Taguchi, the show's initial focus on the middle school and Takeshi's initial job as a teacher was inspired by Kinpachi-sensei.

Staffs

- Kennosuke Hayashi (林 憲之助, Hayashi Ken'nosuke): The principal of Sakuragaoka Middle School. After a negotiation with Captain Ōyama, he allowed Takeshi to be recruited into UGM during weekends, so long as his involvement remains a secret to his students. He was portrayed by Saburō Bōya (坊屋 三郎, Bōya Saburō).
- Kumi Nozaki (野崎 クミ, Nozaki Kumi): The vice principal of the school. She was portrayed by Ikuko Wada (和田 幾子, Wada Ikuko).
- Kyōko Aihara (相原 京子, Aihara Kyōko): A new teacher in Sakuragaoka Middle School like Takeshi. In addition to teaching Physical Education, Kyoko is also a proficient gymnast and pianist. She is portrayed by Mayumi Asano (浅野 真弓, Asano Mayumi).
- Non-chan (ノンちゃん): A school clerk respected by the female students. She is portrayed by Noriko Shirasaka.

Class 1-E students

Class 1-E is Takeshi's main classroom, with most of the monsters from the show's first cour were partly related to his students. 26 years after Taskeshi left the Earth as 80 in Ultraman Mebius, Yukio gathered his former classmates for a reunion after 80's brief appearance in pursuing Roberuga II on Earth. Following Hoe's destruction, each of the students exposed their gratitude towards their teacher despite his short period of teaching them.

- Hiroshi Ueno (上野 博士, Ueno Hiroshi): A bespectacled student whose excelled in Takeshi's class. His nickname is Hakase (ハカセ), due to his first name being an alternate reading for the Japanese word for "professor" (博士, Hakase). In Ultraman Mebius, he becomes a researcher in a university. He is portrayed by Ikumi Ueno (上野 郁巳, Ueno Ikumi).
- Susumu (すすむ): Nicknamed Super (スーパー, Sūpā), due to his father's supermarket being a family business. As his mother had long died, Susumu grew tense with his father who was intending to remarry, although this was later revealed to be a ruse to support the marriage of his older sister, Hiroko. In Ultraman Mebius, Super continued working at his family's supermarket. He is portrayed by Hirotomo Shimizu (清水 浩智, Shimizu Hirotomo).
- Fashion (ファッション, Fasshon): Nicknamed as the "Miss Class 1-E" despite her tomboyish attitude. Her blood type is O. In Ultraman Mebius, Fashion had married and raised three children. She is portrayed by Midori Kuno (久野 みどり, Kuno Midori).
- Junichi Kitai (鍛代 順一, Kitai Jun'ichi): Nicknamed Rakugo (落語) due to his tendency to speak in the same way as a rakugo performer. He scored poorly in science, which is ironically Takeshi's main subject. In Ultraman Mebius, an adult Junichi worked at a shinkin bank. Junichi Kitai is portrayed by a child actor of the same name.
- Yukio Tsukamoto (塚本 幸夫, Tsukamoto Yukio; 2-4): A student who skipped classes due to his inability to befriend others and under the depression of not pursuing the same private school as his past friends did. Yukio was the first to discover Takeshi's true identity and witnessing his fight against Gicogyler inspired the boy to attend class once more. In Ultraman Mebius, Yukio becomes a teacher and used Takeshi's advises to guide his students. He is portrayed by Tetsuya Fujiwara (藤原 哲也, Fujiwara Tetsuya)
- Shinichi Nakano (中野 真一, Nakano Shin'ichi; 3): A student whose crush, Midori, was stolen from him by Shibata. His grief and sadness brought about the creation of Hoe, but Takeshi managed to encourage him to move on and his actions saved Midori from a falling rubble. In Ultraman Mebius, he was revealed to have married a young woman and his past experience with Hoe were joked about by his former classmates. He also recognized the appearance of Hoe but denied any responsibility for its reappearance. He is portrayed by Yasuhiko Saitō (斉藤 康彦, Saitō Yasuhiko).
- Akio Ōshima (大島 明男, Ōshima Akio; 6): A failing student who deluded himself as a disguised alien due to extreme pressure in his life, leading to an encounter with the UFO Monster Abdolaars. He was badly injured but was treated with blood transfusion from his classmates and 80's healing ability, which invalidate his claim as an alien. In Ultraman Mebius, he becomes an astrologer and had at least named a comet after himself. Prior to the classmate reunion, his namesake comet became a battlefield by Zamsher and a pair of Alien Magma. He is portrayed by Toshiharu Oda (小田 敏治, Oda Toshiharu).
- Akira Okajima (岡島 アキラ, Okajima Akira; 7): A music enthusiast who started a rock band with his friends. Their passion for music caused noise complains from their neighborhood and eventually admiration from the monster Noiseler. After that incident, Okajima and his circle of friends decided to take a serious focus on their studies. He is portrayed by Jō Nishiki (新敷 浄, Nishiki Jō).
- Mari (マリ; 1, 12): A female classmate with her circle of friends (including Fashion) whose attempt to prank Hiroshi backfired due to Millie's intervention. She is portrayed by Michie Akimoto (秋元 美智恵, Akimoto Michie).

== Monsters and aliens ==
=== Minus Energy Monsters ===
Takeshi hypothesized that some of the Earth monsters were born from the darkness of human hearts, which he described as Minus Energy (マイナスエネルギー, Mainasu Enerugī). Said energy substance could also affect space monsters by drawing their attention towards Earth. As revealed in Ultraman Mebius, monsters that are associated with Minus Energy in any capacity are designated as Minus Energy Monsters (マイナスエネルギー怪獣, Mainasu Enerugī Kaijū).

The Minus Energy Monsters served their role as manifestations of an Earthling's malice and how both 80 and the guest characters handle their life challenges.

- Full Moon Monster Crescent (月ノ輪怪獣 クレッセント, Tsuki no wa Kaijū Kuressento; 1): An Asian black bear-themed monster Crescent was born from the surplus Minus Energy gathered since the years devoid of monster attacks. Its presence underground caused earthquakes and damaging nearby vegetation but was dismissed until Crescent finally appeared in the middle of the city. While attacking the city and inexperienced UGM combatants, Crescent became the first opponent of Ultraman 80 and was defeated by his Succium Beam, no less thanks to the cheering support from the nearby children. Since Crescent was born underground, the monster had the ability to burrow 70 km/h and exhale a Red Beam (赤色光線, Sekishoku Kōsen) from its mouth.
- Feather Monster Gicogyler (羽根怪獣 ギコギラー, Hane Kaijū Gikogirā; 2): A space monster whose arrival to Earth was caused by many factors, among them being attracted to the Minus Energy. In addition to create a gust of wind, Gicogyler can exhale heat ray from its mouth. It faced against the Sky Higher and Silver Gull piloted by Takeshi, Harada and Tajima respectively during an attack on the city and retreated to the far side of the Moon. At some point of time, Gicogyler appeared on Sakuragaoka and fought against 80 in the middle of Takeshi's crisis with his student, Yukio. After a few acrobatic leaps and kicks, 80 killed the monster with Succium Beam.
- Sulfuric Acid Monster Hoe (硫酸怪獣 ホー, Ryūsan Kaijū Hō; 3): A monster born from the Minus Energy of Shinichi after being rejected by his crush, Midori. Hoe originally started as a red mist that constantly emitted weeping noises and groans in Sakuragaoka's neighborhood area. The next day, Hoe materialized into an actual monster and marched its way to Midori's house. Despite Shinichi's effort to ward the monster, Hoe had just learned to separate from Shinichi and this forced 80 to step in, using Buckle Beam to burn the monster into nothingness. Its abilities are; weeping tears of sulfuric acid from its eyes and exhaling flame from its mouth.
  - Another Hoe was recreated from the Sakuragaoka Middle School's own building's desire to reunite with former first year teacher Takeshi. This particular Hoe retained its original attacks and weakened Mebius until 80's reappearance, to which it willfully surrendered to 80's Buckle Beam and disappeared.
- UFO Monster Abdolaars (UFO怪獣 アブドラールス, Yūfō Kaijū Abudorārusu; 6): A space monster who rode an alien saucer belonged to an unnamed invader. In addition to riding a space saucer, it can fire Flaming Ray (火炎光線, Kaen Kōsen) from its eyes and stored a venomous lymph on its head. The saucer appeared in various parts of the world and made its recent stop in Sakuragaoka, Japan. 80 defeated Abdolaars with continuous kicks and Buckle Beam before destroying its saucer companion with Spiral Beam. Despite the lack of Minus Energy in its debut episode, Abdolaars was regarded as a monster of this category from UGM's database in Ultraman Mebius.
- Noise Monster Noiseler (騒音怪獣 ノイズラー, Sō'on Kaijū Noizurā; 7): A chiroptera space monster with the ability of echolocation and firing beam from its eyes. The monster was attracted to noises and feeds on them. On Earth, Noiseler targeted a commercial airplane in the central alps and later on a Shinkansen. Through Yamato's quick observation, he discovered the monster's affinity for noises and orders the surrounding city to cancel their noises. Noiseler remain asleep, but UGM and the army's opportunity to strike was foiled when it awakened and marched towards Okajima's rock band. Although the monster meant no harm towards the children, 80 fought against it and lured the monster back to space after it became attracted to his Color Timer's noise. The monster was named after the English word for "noise". Despite the lack of Minus Energy in its debut episode, Noiseler was regarded as a monster of this category from UGM's database in Ultraman Mebius. Noiseler's popularity in the anime series Kaiju Girls led to the recreation of its suit in the year 2018 through a crowdfunding project.
- Oil Monster Gabishale (オイル怪獣 ガビシェール, Oiru Kaijū Gabishēru; 9): Originating from northern China, Gabishale moved underground by burrowing for as far as 5,000 km a day and fed on oil refineries through its extendable tongue. The devoured oil in return also allowed Gabishale to exhale flame as part of its attack. After an attack on one of the oil refineries in Japan, Gabishale attacked an airport in Narita where Kyoko and the class 1-E students met her suitor from Paris. Takeshi transformed into 80 after saving Kyoko and the students as he fought Gabishale and ended the fight with Succium Beam. Despite the lack of Minus Energy in its debut episode, Gabishale was regarded as a monster of this category from UGM's database in Ultraman Mebius.
- Space Creature Jacky (宇宙生物 ジャッキー, Uchū Seibutsu Jakkī; 10): A turbo sazae-like organism from Planet R that was modified into reconnaissance purposes and is capable of fusing with any organism. Aruma used Jacky as a pet on Earth to spy on the Sakuragaoka Middle School while evaluating on mankind but the creature absorbed too much Minus Energy and went berserk. It was assimilated to an elephant which led to the formation of Zuruzler. 80 would shrunk himself into smaller size to drive Jacky out and returned to Aruma.
- Transformed Monster Zuruzler (変形怪獣 ズルズラー, Henkei Kaijū Zuruzurā; 10): A monster born from an elephant accidentally eating Jacky, causing the space creature to be assimilated with it while driven berserk from the Minus Energy it absorbed. Thanks to Jacky's shell-like physiology, this feature was carried out to Zuruzler for its durable hide, in addition to its elephant features such as brute strength, a pair of tusks and long trunk to spray pressurized stream of water. After expelling Jacky from Zuruzler, 80 reverted the monster to its original form through Ultra Eye Spot.
- Insect Monster Guwaganda (昆虫怪獣 グワガンダ, Konchū Kaijū Guwaganda; 36): (Note: In the 1982 magazine Ultraman White Paper, it was mistakenly named as Kuwaganda (クワガンダ).) It was originally a stag beetle belonged to a 4th grade student Acchan, wanting his pet to survive during the entire winter period but was accidentally killed by Yama-chan's mother, who expose it to cold. Out of grief, Acchan's Minus Energy resonated with the carcass and resurrected it into a monster. Guwaganda terrorized the city and fought against 80 until Acchan and Yama-chan bury their hatchet, allowing the monster to finally return to its grave. However, Yamato resurrected the beetle with 80's power as a favor for the children.
- Delusion Ultraseven (妄想ウルトラセブン, Mōsō Urutorasebun; 44): (Note: Also named as Grudge Ultraseven (怨念ウルトラセブン, On'nen Urutorasebun).) Originally an Ultraseven action figure under ownership of a young soccer player Naoto Tajima. After being hospitalized from the attack of a bōsōzoku biker gang, Naoto's lingering grudge resonated with his Seven figure and merged with his Ikiryō into a copy of the real Seven. While in the middle of chasing the biker gang from earlier, "Seven" was forced to fend himself against 80 and the combined forces of UGM due to the collateral damages he caused. After being lectured by 80 for his selfishness, 80 returned Naoto's spirit to his body though Timer Shot and brought the lifeless "Seven" away from Earth. A fully healed Naoto returned to play soccer and had since moved past his grudges. Aside from being an Ultraseven copy, he can fire a bluish Fake Emerium Ray (フェイクエメリウム光線, Feiku Emeriumu Kōsen) from his Beam Lamp and perform soccer kicks.

=== Good ===
- Planet Researcher Aruma (惑星調査員 アルマ, Wakusei Chōsa-in Aruma; 10): Although coming from a different world, she was said to be 80's childhood friend. After becoming a planet researcher for the Galactic Republic Alliance (銀河共和同盟所属, Ginga Kyōwa Dōmei Shozoku), Aruma was sent down to observe mankind's behavior on Earth while bringing along Jacky. Her investigation was to determine if mankind should be eradicated started with the students and staffs of Sakuragaoka Middle School, which only gave her negative scores through Jacky but Takeshi was able to show her otherwise. After regaining Jacky, Aruma apologized to 80 for all the trouble she had caused and decided to re-evaluate her report after leaving Earth. She is portrayed by Mariko Endō (遠藤 真理子, Endō Mariko).
- Friendly Alien Alien Ruriya (友好宇宙人 ルリヤ星人, Yūkō Uchūjin Ruriya Seijin; 16): A human-like alien from the Horsehead Nebula. After imprisoning Devilon in the Snow Art, Ruriya also passed their warnings of the monster and its main weakness. He is voiced by Shojirō Kihara (木原 正二郎, Kihara Shojirō).
- Sawako Hoshi (星 沢子, Hoshi Sawako; 17, 18): An alien girl whose spaceship crash-landed on Shiokaze Island after an attack from Gymaira. For 20 years, she was raised by a couple and eventually became Chief Itō's fiancée. In the present day, Gymaira's awakening, the Shiokaze Island residents' brainwashing and Itō's transformation into Lavras forced her to resort to her own actions, going as far as to sabotage UGM's equipment to prevent their intervention. Following Chief Itō's death, Sawako gave her life to revive him. She is portrayed by Midori Takei (竹井 みどり, Takei Midori).
- Alien L85 "Zuckal" (L85星人 ザッカル, Eru Hachi-jū Go Seijin Zakkaru; 21): A member of the Space G-man (宇宙Gメン, Uchū Jīmen) who hunted Gamos for the past 20 years after the monster killed his wife and child. With two days left until his resignation, Zuckal swore to apprehend the monster, going as far as to attack Takeshi through telepathy and refusing 80's help. He transformed into a giant and fought Gamos alone but his injuries began catching up to him. In his dying breath, Zuckal exposed Gamos' weakness to 80 and his corpse was brought to outer space. He is portrayed by Takeshi Ōbayashi (大林 丈史, Ōbayashi Takeshi).
- Underground Kingdom People Underground Men (地底王国人 地底人, Chitei Ōkoku-jin Chiteijin; 22): A race of humanoids that once lived on Earth until they went underground in anticipation of the ice age. Up until the present day, the numbers of the underground men were equal to those of mankind. The kind predicted that Earth would suffer from various natural disasters as a result of an upcoming planetary alignment within two years and launched an artificial satellite that severed Earth from sunlight as a test for mankind. When Ishijima ordered the missile to attack their artificial satellite, this awakened Gomora II and caused the destruction of their civilization.
  - Underground Kingdom Queen Queen Einus (地底王国女王 イーナス, Chitei Ōkoku-jō Īnasu; 22): The ruler of the underground kingdom with the ability of precognition and mind reading. Having well aware of Yamato's extraterrestrial origin, Einus was willing to negotiate in a peaceful term with the Earthlings and ceased her kind's hostility towards UGM. However the actions of Ishijima and their civilization's destruction caused Einus to disappear with her people following Gomora II's attack. She is portrayed by Reiko Kayama (加山 麗子, Kayama Reiko).
- Maihime (舞姫; 26): The princess of Yomi with an identical resemblance to Emi. When the Akuzone invaded said dimension, Maihime and several few were held in captivity by the group until Takeshi and Emi went to the rescue. She is portrayed by Eri Ishida.
- Migration bird Monster Val (渡り鳥怪獣 バル, Wataridori Kaijū Baru; 28): A flock of space migratory birds that passed the Earth each decade. Several Vals were killed by Zakira and one of its eggs dropped on Earth alongside its parents' remains. Upon hatching, a young Val mistook Takeshi for its parent and imitated his movements. Despite UGM's attempts in protecting the monster, Val sacrificed itself to save 80 from Zakira. Its spirit would join the fallen comrade of similar species in departing for space.
- Boy Monster Tetsuon (少年怪獣 テツオン, Shōnen Kaijū Tetsuon; 39): Originally an underachieving young boy named Tetsuo Tabata (田畑テツ男, Tabata Tetsuo), he was transformed into a human-sized yellow monster after accidentally swallowing the seed of a Space-Plant parasite. Despite his grotesque appearance, Tetsuon obtained the ability to use telekinesis, teleportation, high-level intelligence and inhuman physicality. Despite his selfish and gluttonous approach, Tetsuon put his new abilities to use by winning a costume award and helping others with their studies. Seeing how his new abilities caused Tetsuon to be alienated, Yamato decided to become 80 and destroy the Space-Plant, reverting the monster into a young boy. Tetsuo is portrayed by Masahiko Akazawa (赤沢 雅彦, Akazawa Masahiko). Tetsuon was voiced by Kazue Takahashi and portrayed by Tetsuo Yamamura, the two actors had originally participated in Kaiju Booska.
- Sumo Monster Jihibikiran (すもう怪獣 ジヒビキラン, Sumō Kaijū Jihibikiran; 40): Originally an unnamed son of a wood-cutter in Mount Ashigara, the Sumo boy (すもう小僧, Sumō kozō) was killed by the villagers due to their jealousy of the boy's prodigy in Sumo matches. He transformed into the spirit of Jihibikiran upon death and usually challenged 100 opponents into Sumo competitions before returning to his 10–20 years period of slumber. He was awakened the night after being summoned by a group of children and defeated all members of Sera's university Sumo club. A pair of thieves manipulated the Sumo boy into doing their dirty work. After being shocked by an electric fence in the city, the Sumo Boy transforms into Jihibikiran and accepted 80's challenge in a brawl. Although losing to 80, Jihibikiran gave his word to return to the mountains and was given a set of lunch by Takeshi as a parting gift. As the Sumo Boy, he is portrayed by Jun Tanabe (田辺 潤, Tanabe Jun).
- Vase Spirit Marjin (壺の精 マアジン, Tsubo no Sei Mājin; 46): A genie that was trapped in a vase and released to grant the wishes of children in exchange of cleaning the city. However, more children started to get involve and their actions only cleaning up their self-made messes just to get the genie's attention. When the children accidentally wished for Red King III, his vase broke in the middle of the chaos. Marjin was freed after that but he granted the children snow in Tokyo as a final gift. He was portrayed by Akio Yokoyama (横山 あきお, Yokoyama Akio).
- Marathon Monster Idatenran (マラソン怪獣 イダテンラン, Marason Kaijū Idatenran; 48): A Skanda-themed monster from Mountain Shinigami of Chūbu region. He was revered by the nearby villagers but has a fear of dogs due to being bitten by one of them. His human form is Marathon boy (マラソン小僧, Marason kozō), but was given the name Sōta Shinigami (死神 走太, Shinigami Sōta) when offered to participate in a marathon by the Seiun Middle School's principal. After being mocked by a student from that school, he went berserk as Idatenran that night and even fought against UGM and 80 before retreating. During the marathon day, Sōta found himself evenly matched with Masao but was frightened by the principal's dog into transforming back into Idatenran. 80 reverted Idatenran to his human form and lost the race, but decided to return to the Mountain Shinigami on good terms. As Sōta, he is portrayed by Seiya Kobayashi (小林 聖和, Kobayashi Seiya).

=== Evil ===
- Four Dimensional Alien Alien Bam (四次元宇宙人 バム星人, Yojigen Uchūjin Bamu Seijin; 5): A group of aliens who set up their base of operations in the fourth dimension and used a train to kidnap humans to make them their slaves. Yamato had boarded into one of their trains by accident and found himself on the run as the dimension cancelled his Bright Stick's powers. Despite his injured left arm, Yamato managed to slip in and break the aliens' control panel, allowing him to become 80 and defeating Mechagiras. The destruction of their mecha robot would result in the return of the captured humans. At least one of the Alien Bam disguised as a taxi driver is portrayed by Yasuhiko Uchida (打田 康比古, Uchida Yasuhiko).
- Four Dimensional Robo Monster Mechagiras (四次元ロボ獣 メカギラス, Yojigen Robo-jū Mekagirasu; 5): The Alien Bam's invasion mecha, armed with 2000 missiles, energy beam, energy shield and the ability to teleport. It was sent from the fourth dimension to attack the city and UGM's second radar base. After sustaining significant damage, Mechagiras was called back to the fourth dimension for maintenance. It was released again when Yamato destroyed its control panel and fought 80 with its teleportation and capabilities. Realizing that its invulnerability was due to the fourth dimension, 80 teleported the monster to Earth and finish it with Succium Beam.
- Resurrected Monster Tabra (復活怪獣 タブラ, Fukkatsu Kaijū Tabura; 8): An ancient monster sealed within a mountain by the unnamed giant of light during its reign of terror against humanity. 3 millennia had passed on and Tabra was reawakened due to an earthquake and had devoured a pair of hikers. Said earthquake struck again and endangered the lives of 1-E students as 80 appeared and finished the monster with Succium Beam. Its sole ability is to fire energy ray from its eyes. Tabra is named after the Japanese word for "deceive" (たぶらかす, Taburakasu).
- Alien Vibros "Millie" (ビブロス星人 ミリー, Biburosu Seijin Mirī; 12): An alien girl who was sent by her kind to assassinate Takeshi Yamato/Ultraman 80 by posing as his new student, Millie Aoyama (青山 ミリー, Aoyama Mirī). Due to experiencing the kindness of the Earthlings, especially from Hiroshi Ueno, Millie had second thoughts on her mission. What happened to her was unknown, but Yamato told Hiroshi that Millie was sent to the Netherlands. She is portrayed by Judy Morris (ジュディ・モーリス, Judi Mōrisu) and voiced by Sakiko Katō (加藤 早紀子, Katō Sakiko).
- Magma Monster Gora (マグマ怪獣 ゴラ, Maguma Kaijū Gora; 12): A space warrior-like monster sent by the Alien Vibros to accompany Millie in their invasion of Earth. Gora started as a meteor-like egg that hide itself within Mt. Asada. After absorbing enough magma, Gora hatched and resort to fight 80 under the Vibros' command until it was defeated, forcing the rest of the Alien Vibros to cancel their invasion plan. As a flame-themed monster, Gora recuperated in volcanic environments and exhale magma from its mouth.
- Resurrection Monster Salamandora (再生怪獣 サラマンドラ, Saisei Kaijū Saramandora; 13): A space monster manipulated by Alien Gorgon. It was first used by the aliens as means of infiltrating Earth by attacking Japan but was destroyed. After the Silver Gull destroyed the monster by targeting its weak point (its neck/throat), Salamandora exploded into pieces, allowing the Alien Gorgon to emerge and salvage one of its cells. After the death of one of its members and being exposed by Yamato, the remaining Alien Gorgon was forced to merge with a leftover of Salamandora's cells to revive the monster. Yamato transformed into 80 when the previous Formation Yamato failed to intercept the monster again. After struggling with the monster's strong hide, 80 uses Ultra Eye Spot towards its throat and ensuring that neither Salamandora's cells nor the Alien Gorgon could survive the explosion. In addition to its thick hide, Salamandora could fire projectiles and exhale a 1,300 °C Flame Heat Ray (火炎熱線, Kaen Nessen).
- Skull Phantom Alien Gorgon (ドクロ怪人 ゴルゴン星人, Dokuro Kaijin Gorugon Seijin; 13): A group of five aliens aiming for Earth invasion. They had the ability to shrink into microscopic sizes in order to hide, having done so by slipping into Saramandora's cells to ensure their presence went undetected. The Alien Gorgon had assassinated various leaders of UGM's foreign branches and set their sight on Captain Ōyama. One lone operative posed as the European UGM officer Mary Clark (マリー・クラーク, Marī Kurāku) and failed to assassinate the captain, assuming her corpse to put the blame on Ōyama. Its four other comrades further instigated the blame by posing as civilians that led the riot against UGM but their ruse were exposed thanks to Yamato's Bright Stick-imbued rifle. In their desperate move, the remaining Gorgon merged with Salamandora's cell to revive the monster. Its disguise as Mary Clark is portrayed by Dean Balaklav (デアン・バラクラフ, Dean Barakurafu).
- Teleport Monster Zarudon (テレポート怪獣 ザルドン, Terepōto Kaijū Zarudon; 14): A carnivorous monster that feed on humans. It was first sighted on Europe and went to Japan to continue its feast on humans. Chief Itō tracked the monster since then by studying teleportation and found it sleeping in an abandoned facility. While trying to rescue the hypnotized humans through Yamato's help, Tajima accidentally awakened the monster. Yamato transformed into 80 and used the monster's teleportation against it by forcing the two into a different dimension before finishing it with Succium Beam. By firing the Teleport Light Rings (テレポート光輪, Terepōto Kōrin) from its eyes, Zarudon would kidnap its target to a desired location and hypnotize its victims before eating them. It was named after the Japanese word for "cold udon" (ざるうどん, Zaru Udon).
- Telepathy Monster Devilon (テレパシィ怪獣 デビロン, Terepashī Kaijū Debiron; 16): An evil monster that was imprisoned within the Snow Art (スノーアート, Sunō Āto) crystal and thrown into outer space by the Alien Ruriya. The Snow Art remain drifted until the space exploration ship Orion picked it up in between Neptune and Pluto, where it was put on display by the authorities within a museum. When Emi accidentally used an infrared ray, the crystal broke and Devilon escaped by taking possession of her body and used its Destructive Psychokinesis (破壊念力, Hakai Nenriki) to either destroy the city or turning its victims against each others. After being fired upon by the army, Devilon grew large and manipulated the brainwashed UGM members in against 80. Devilon's power is ineffective in air pocket phenomenon and 80 choke the monster to release Emi, allowing the Ultra to take her place and went to space where he could safely destroying Devilon with Succium Beam.
- Vampire Monster Gymaira (吸血怪獣 ギマイラ, Kyūketsu Kaijū; 17, 18): A space monster that crash-landed on Shiokaze Island 20 years prior to the series. Awakened in the present day, Gymaira unleashed hypnotic fog to cover its presence from UGM's satellite that draws any nearby human victims while draining their blood. Said victims would later turn into the monster's slaves. After discovering UGM's investigation attempts on Shiokaze Island, Gymaira transformed Chief Itō into Lavras and manipulated both him and Daron into fighting 80. Following Daron's death and being exposed by Sawako's detonators, Gymaira was forced to fight 80 on its own. When Lavras sacrificed itself to save 80, the Ultra mustered his remaining strength to turn the tables and destroying it with the Moonsalt Kick. In addition to its Hypnotic Fog (催眠霧, Saimin Kiri) and Destruction Ray (破壊光線, Hakai Kōsen), Gymaira can unleash a Monster-Changing Ray (怪獣化光線, Kaijū-ka Kōsen) to mutate its target into monsters.
- Bump Monster Okorinball (コブ怪獣 オコリンボール, Kobu Kaijū Okorinbōru; 20): Originally a colony of space parasites named Vampire Balls (吸血ボール, Kyūketsu Bōru) that first attacked the space ship Moon Serenade before making their way to Earth. By slipping into one of UGM's patrol cars, they attacked the base and almost killed Tajima had not for an emergency operation. After attacking the Kanto area and UNDA's press conference, the balls combined into Okorinball and fought against 80. 80 used the Ultra Eye Spot to strip the monster from all Vampire Ball components, leaving its main leader to escape but 80 intercepted it at the last minute.
- Cruel Monster Gamos (残酷怪獣 ガモス, Zankoku Kaijū Gamosu; 21): A snake-like notorious space monster listed as the second wanted criminal by the Space G-Man. Its main abilities were spraying dissolving liquid, firing shockwave beams from eyes and launching thorn missiles. After killing Zuckal's family on his home world, Gamos went to Earth 20 years later to continue its reign of terror. Gamos originally fought against Zuckal and later on 80, who exploited its weaknesses for high frequency sounds before burning it with Buckle Beam.
- Friendly Alien Alien Fantas (友好宇宙人 ファンタス星人, Yūkō Uchūjin Fantasu Seijin; 24): A race of peaceful aliens who lived in a world that is far more advanced than Earth. The actual race had since wiped out by their identical-looking androids who initiated a rebellion against all organic life forms. On Earth, the Fantas androids tried to disguise themselves as their original creators and attempted to enslave mankind under the pretense of a peaceful meeting between national leaders to join the Great Galactic Federation (銀河大連邦, Ginga Dai Renpō). Realizing that Takeshi had discovered their true nature, the "Fantas" attempted to kill him both prior to their arrival and during his eventual arrest at the national embassy. However, by that time, UGM had already exposed their true nature to the entire world and this forced the remaining "Fantas" to use Robo-Fow. The androids were wiped out after 80 caused Robo-Fow to crash upon its defeat. The Alien Fantas leader is voiced by Tsutomu Akashi (明石 勤, Akashi Tsutomu).
- Combat Saucer Robo-Fow (戦闘円盤 ロボフォー, Sentō Enban Robo-Fō; 24): The Fantas android's mode of transformation from outer space, armed with laser beams, missiles and Stop Ray (ストップ光線, Sutoppu Kōsen) attack that freeze its targets in suspended animation. Robo-Fow transformed into a combat robot after the androids' plans for Earth invasion was discovered. The saucer attacked the combined forces of UGM, UNDA and Ultraman 80 after Takeshi was cleared of charge by his captain, only to be defeated by the continuous use of Succium Beam and Buckle Beam.
- Transforming Monster Argon (変身怪獣 アルゴン, Henshin Kaijū Arugon; 25): An intelligent space monster that assisted an unnamed alien race in piloting his own saucer against UGM Japan headquarters. When his saucer crashed as a result of Formation Yamato, Argon assumed the human form Ryū (リュウ) and feigned injury to be picked up by UNDA trainee Jun. The next day, he exposed himself and assisted the alien saucer to attack the UGM headquarters. After saving Jun, 80 used Yellow Z Ray to destroy the alien saucer and killed Argon with Hand-Up Beam. As Ryū, he is portrayed by Katsumi Hirano (平野 克己, Hirano Katsumi).
- Extradimensional People Akuzone (異次元人 アクゾーン, Ijigenjin Akuzōn; 26): A race of other dimensional humanoids trying to take over other dimensions, they consist of troop captain Mebez (メビーズ, Mebīzu) and Dr. Goige (ゴイゲ博士, Goige Hakase) while lizard-like beings served as their troops. Using the Metamor System (メタモルシステム, Metamoru Shisutemu) for inter-dimensional travel, the Akuzone invaded Yomi and captured its inhabitants, leaving the survivors to regroup at the mountains. When Takeshi and Emi led the survivors to rescue their princess, the two Akuzone figures tried to send their monster, Gera, to the Earth but Maihime foiled their plan at the last minute. This forced Mebez to jump from the castle while Goige was accidentally killed by his own men. The remaining Akuzone saucers were destroyed by 80 prior to his and Emi's escape from Yomi. Mebez and Dr. Goige were portrayed by Yūdai Ishimaru (石山 雄大, Ishimaru Yūdai) and Munemaru Kōda (幸田 宗丸, Kōda Munemaru).
- Gigantified Monster Gera (巨大化怪獣 ゲラ, Kyodai-ka Kaijū Gera; 26): A small monster used by the Akuzone to invade the Earth from Yomi, capable of exhaling 300,000 degree flame. When Maihime disrupted their Metamor System, Gera was unleashed onto Yomi instead. Gera was destroyed by Ultraman 80 via the Hula Hoop Ray.
- Bubble Alien Alien Argo (泡星人 アルゴ星人, Awa Seijin Arugo Seijin; 27): An evil alien that survived the destruction of its home world and was the last of its kind. Argo was infamous for assimilating with other beings for their intelligence. The alien possessed Dr. Aoyama during his trip back to Earth and orchestrated a series of disappearances through Dissolving Bubbles (溶解泡, Yōkai Awa). When Takeshi was captured by Argo into a special barrier, the alien was left on his own to terrorize the city before the youth escaped and turned into 80. The Ultra exploited its weakness for sudden flash before killing Argo with Succium Beam.
- Space Jaws Zakira (スペース・ジョーズ ザキラ, Supēsu Jōzu Zakira; 28): A carnivorous space monster that flew with the speed of Mach 10 and shoots laser beam. that preyed upon Val's species, eating them would result in Zakira's increase of strength. After slaughtering a group of space migration birds, Zakira went to Earth to eat Val while easily fending itself against 80 and UGM members. Its mistake on killing Val caused 80 to retaliate by several attacks before ending the fight with the Succium Beam.
- Transforming Alien Alien Zatan (変身宇宙人 ザタン星人, Henshin Uchūjin Zatan Sejin; 30): A ruthless alien race known for conquering countless worlds. A pair of aliens arrived on Earth at some point of time, killing and impersonated as Sera's seniors Tsuchiyama (土山) and Aoki (青木) from the same newspaper company. Throughout their frequent visit to UGM, the Alien Zatan used it to keep track on UGM's frequent activities and at one point sabotaged the Silver Gull piloted by Yamato and Ikeda. Their presence were exposed due to their invertebrate physiology but the Zatans quickly held Sera hostage to force UGM into surrendering the Space Observation Center. The aliens were killed by Yamato and Sera, but "Tsuchiyama" unleashed Zatan Silver in his dying breath. Tsuchiyama and Aoki are portrayed by Kengo Maki (槇 健吾, Maki Kengo) and Kazuo Ōtani (大谷 一夫, Ōtani Kazuo) respectively.
- Invasion Monster Zatan Silver (侵略怪獣 ザタンシルバー, Shinryaku Kaijū Zatan Shirubā; 30): The Alien Zatans' invasion weapon, an armored robot monster. Zatan Silver was summoned to wreak havoc and retreated multiple times before UGM's arrival due to its master's infiltration. The robot was unleashed again by Alien Zatan in his dying breath to attack the Space Observation Center. Due to the robot's use of metallic armor, 80 froze its inner workings before unleashing Timer Shot to destroy Zatan Silver.
- Plant-like Monster Zora (植物もどき怪獣 ゾラ, Shokubutsu Modoki Kaijū Zora; 31): A malevolent space plant that fell on Earth as a seed planted by a young girl named Mariko. The space plant inhales oxygen and exhales carbon dioxide, at the same time capable of draining nearby life forms like a parasite. After growing to the size of a monster, 80 appeared and cut off its limbs before finishing the monster with Succium Beam. Mariko's drained flowers were restored by 80 in hopes of cheering her mother. As a giant plant monster, Zora can exhale poison pollen and use 200 meter vines on its arms as whips.
- Three-necked Monster Firedorako (三つ首怪獣 ファイヤードラコ, Mitsu-kubi Kaijū Faiyādorako; 35): A three headed ancient monster, each head is colored white, red and blue. In order to stop the monster from rampaging in the Yamanami Village, the local priest intoxicated them with sake and severe their heads. A dragon ball salvaged from the monster's remains were kept in the shrine and polished every 99 years to prevent Firedorako's return. In the present day, Firedorako's heads were reincarnated into three individuals and return to their original form after stealing back their dragon ball. 80 fought the three-headed monster, where Mitsuo rebelled against his comrades and allowing 80 to kill the monster while leaving the boy unharmed.
  - Fire-blowing Man (火吹き男, Hifuki Otoko): The main red head of Firedorako and has the ability to exhale flames to the point of killing humans even in his human form. He is portrayed by Takeo Shinkai (新海 丈夫, Shinkai Takeo).
  - Strong Man (怪力男, Kairiki Otoko): The blue head of Firedorako with superhuman strength. Once combined as a dragon, his head was used as a headbutt attack. He was portrayed by Hitoshi Ōmae (大前 均, Ōmae Hitoshi).
  - Mitsuo (光男): The reincarnation of the white head, he was taken care by his priest uncle after an accident that claimed his entire family. Despite having enjoyed his life as a young human, Mitsuo was pressured by the other two heads to steal the dragon ball and unwillingly participated in the monster's formation. Mitsuo rebelled against the other two heads to assist 80 and spared from destruction, giving the young boy another chance in continuing his normal life. He is portrayed by Koichi Sugimoto (杉本 浩一, Sugimoto Koichi).
- Space Ninja Alien Baltan (宇宙忍者 バルタン星人, Uchū Ninja Barutan Seijin): Successors of the original Baltan from episode 2 of Ultraman.
  - V (五代目, Godaime; 37): A manager of the space zoo on Planet Baltan, who desired to capture Ultraman 80 as part of his inferior specimens exhibits. Taking advantage of an envious young boy named Masao Morita (森田 政夫, Morita Masao), Baltan impersonated the young boy to slip into UGM. The UGM members were too late to discover his identity as Baltan had the ship capturing Yamato's Silver Gull. After escaping and transform into 80, he fought the giant Baltan by countering the latter's invisibility technique. 80 would kill the alien by throwing him into his own space ship. He is voiced by Tetsuo Mizutori (水鳥 鐵夫, Mizutori Tetsuo) and portrayed by Kiyoshi Ōkuri (大栗 清史, Ōkuri Kiyoshi) when disguising as Masao.
  - VI (六代目, Rokudaime; 45): An individual who wished to create chaos on Earth by throwing mankind into a state of disarray. While on the run from UGM, he manipulated a young boy named Yamano into fighting his friends over their differing opinions for UFO. After kidnapping Yamano and his circle of friends, the Baltan grew large and rampaged while keeping the children hostages. 80 killed Baltan with th Ultra Slash to counter his invisibility and saved the children. He is voiced by Tomomichi Nishimura (西村 知道, Nishimura Tomomichi) and portrayed by Tomiko Ishii (石井 富子, Ishii Tomiko) when disguising as Masaya's mother.
- Poltergeist Monster Gosedon (心霊怪獣 ゴースドン, Shinrei Kaijū Gōsudon; 38): Originally a malicious aura that dwell around the vicinity of Mt. Nakatsu. Its presence was sighted by the truck driver that eventually died two months later when his alibi was dismissed by anyone except his son, Futoshi. The aura would eventually take the form of a monster after assimilating with the image on Masaru's kite. After overpowering Ultraman 80 with its attacks, the Ultra tied the monster and flew it in the same vein as a kite before dropping it and killing Gosedon with Ultra Aura. Based on Masau's depiction of his monster, Gosedon's weapons are a lightning sword, a pair of morning stars, kite-like wings on its back and its horn to shoot the Lightning Ray (稲妻光線, Inazuma Kōsen).
- Whip Arm Monster Zuraswimer (ムチ腕怪獣 ズラスイマー, Muchi Ude Kaijū Zurasuimā; 42): An ancient monster sealed underneath the Heiwa Kannon statue in Utsunomiya. When a pair of thieves detonated the Kannon statue to uncover a buried treasure box, Zuraswimer was unleashed and managed to effortlessly resisting UGM. With the help of the Kannon statue, 80 used Ultra Kannon Ray to reseal Zuraswimer and leave behind flowers.
- Invasion Alien King Galtan (侵略星人 ガルタン大王, Shinryaku Seijin Garutan Dai-Ō; 43): An alien swordsman that leads a group of Alien Garagara in his conquest to invade the Planet Ultra. His main weapon is an over-sized liuyedao. With the invasion failed and losing his son, Galtan and his men chased Yullian towards Earth and attempted to personally kill 80 using Emi as a leverage. The giant King Galtan was defeated in his fight by 80 after having his sword sliced by Ultra Double Arrow and exploded from Succium Beam. He is voiced by Yasuo Muramatsu (村松 康雄, Muramatsu Yasuo). As revealed in the Ultraman Mebius novel The Sword to Protect, a young King Galtan had once fought against and defeated by Zamsher.
- Nomadic Alien Alien Garagara (遊牧星人 ガラガラ星人, Yūboku Seijin Garagara Seijin; 43): A group of nomadic aliens that usually worked in synchronization with their own group due to weaker capability when operating alone. They are named after the Japanese onomatopoeia for rattling noises, and produce such noises in their appearances. A fraction of Alien Garagara were King Galtan's invasion troops in against the Planet Ultra and eventually made their way on Earth to pursue Yullian. Mistaking Emi for the Ultra princess in disguise, they kidnapped her as Galtan's leverage to bait Yamato. Although one of them managed to kill Emi, all of them were killed when Galtan enlarged to fight 80 at the cost of destroying their hideout in the process. As revealed in the Ultraman Mebius novel The Sword to Protect, countless Alien Garagara were Zamsher's opponents in his past.
- Combined Monsters (合体怪獣, Gattai Kaijū) Pluzuma (プラズマ, Rurazuma) and Minuzuma (マイナズマ, Mainazuma) (49): A pair of malicious sibling monster from Mt. Nio of Okutama, Tokyo, both had the ability to unleash horn beams and shooting energy beams of different poles (Pluzuma for positive and Minuzuma for negative poles), as well as combining on each other's backs to become stronger. Initially, the two had been signaling each other's with 1520 kHz radio wave to communicate and at the same time deceiving UGM into shrouding their appearance as 14 different monsters. Tsutomu's act of mimicking Minuzuma's radio wave caused Pluzuma to appear and chased the boy. To make matters worse, Pluzuma summoned his younger brother Minuzuma and injured Yamato's shoulder, hampering him even as 80. With combined brothers proved too much for 80 to handle, Ryōko was forced to transform into Yullian for the first time and both Ultras perform Double Power to destroy both monsters at once.
- Freezing Monster Margodon (冷凍怪獣 マーゴドン, Reitō Kaijū Māgodon; 50): The last opponent in the series. A space monster with resemblance to mammoth that hunts planets to absorb heat and turn them into frozen stars. On Earth, Margodon froze the entire city in Minamihara City of Kyushu with freezing liquid from its body and freezing gas from its trunk. However, as Margodon is a cold-attribute monster, its entire body is fragile. UGM first sortie to gather the data and decided to personally deal with the monster before the entire solar system doomed to destruction. With their true identity revealed, Takeshi and Ryōko were ordered to stay behind by Ōyama, wanting UGM to prove mankind's worth in protecting the Earth. After freezing Margodon with liquid nitrogen, UGM smash the frozen monster into pieces with a giant wrecking ball. Margodon's appearance was recorded as the last monster attack on Earth up until the arrival of Ultraman Mebius in 25 years later.

=== Neutral ===
- Parent Monster Mother Zandrias (親怪獣 マザーザンドリアス, Oya Kaijū Mazā Zandoriasu; 4): A maternal monster and mother to the Zandrias. When her child ran away to Earth as a result of a disagreement, Mother Zandrias landed on the United States and faced against the American branch of UNDA before tracking Zandrias towards Sakuragaoka in Japan. At that moment, she try to reconcile with Zandrias but her efforts went awry before 80 stepped in and staged a fight and the mother-child pair flew back to space. Mother Zandrias can fly at the speed of Mach 10 and fires energy beam from her eyes.
  - Spoiled Child Monster Zandrias (だだっ子怪獣 ザンドリアス, Dadakko Kaijū Zandoriasu; 4): A young Zandrias monster from space, its age is that of a middle school student when compared to human age and is currently entering a teenage rebellion phase. As a result of a disagreement with its mother, it flew towards Earth and turned into a crystallized form while underground. The monster made its way towards Sakuragaoka and still quarreling with its mother before 80 staged a fight to get the pair to reconcile. Zandrias is capable of flying on Earth at the speed of Mach 8 and encase itself within a pink crystal for space travel at Mach 20. Its sole attack is exhaling a beam of heat ray from its mouth. Its popularity in Kaiju Girls led to the recreation of its suit through a crowdfunding event in year 2017.
- Poison Gas Monster Medan (毒ガス怪獣 メダン, Dokugasu Kaijū Medan; 11): A monster born from an egg of a space creature found inside the gas pipe of a natural gas storage base on Hiruma Island. Upon hatching, Medan grew to the size of an adult human by overnight by feasting on natural gas. UGM was dispatched in the daylight to kill Medan, but its remaining cells survive the destruction by taking a form reminiscent of a sea shell. Jono took the shell along when returning to UGM's base where the monster regenerated and escaped through the gas line that led Medan to the city. In addition to its regenerative ability and exhaling poisonous gas from its nose, Medan's natural gas composition made it vulnerable to even the slightest of explosion. As the now giant Medan's location was under a thunderstorm, Harada used the Sky Higher to act as a lightning rod to shield the monster before 80 saved him and took his place as a conduit. After Medan was frozen by a missile, 80 took its body to outer space for safe detonation.
- Experimental Monster Mue (実験怪獣 ミュー, Jikken Kaijū Myū; 15): A monster which UGM spokesperson Sera found in Monster Graveyard (怪獣墓場, Kaijū Hakaba) during his 6 months exploration in Space Mammy. Mue was a space monster separated from its mother and was nearing death. In order to nurse it back to health, UGM surrendered it to Emi's father for treatment, but his assistant Nakagawa conducted various experiments with Mue until it grows large and turned the supposedly herbivore monster into carnivore. At a large size, Mue can fire Bizarre Buster (ビザールバスター, Bizāru Basutā) energy beam. Under Emi's guidance, 80 shrank Mue back to its original size and sent it back to space.
- Octopus Monster Daron (タコ怪獣 ダロン, Tako Kaijū Daron; 17, 18): An octopoda monster that lived in the vicinity of Shiokaze Island's coastal area, having the ability to unleash electrical discharge with its tentacles. As one of Gymaira's enslaved victims, the mind-controlled Daron was manipulated into assisting Lavras in against Ultraman 80. Chief Itō managed to regain control at the last minute and save 80 by hitting the octopus monster's eyes, allowing the latter to escape and kill it with Ultra Lance.
- Planet Monster Gauss (惑星怪獣 ガウス, Wakusei Kaijū Gausu; 19): Originally an organism living in its namesake planet. Gauss's planet was among the other four that suffered from the radiation of UGM's Red Rose project to destroy a rogue planet that was about to hit the Earth. Angered by the loss of his home world, Gauss attacked the Earth but 80 transported it to a planet with similar environment to its original home world. As a result of UGM's use of R1 to detonate Red Rose and how its radiation affected the monster, Gauss can exhale the very same Radioactive Gas (放射能ガス, Hoshano Gasu) and shoots eye beams with the destructive power of 10,000 tons of TNT.
- Ancient Monster Gomora II (古代怪獣 ゴモラII, Kodai Kaijū Gomora Tsū; 22): A monster that first appeared in episodes 26 and 27 of Ultraman. In Ultraman 80, Gomora II was explained originally one of the surface-dwelling creatures that went underground alongside the underground men and mutated into its current appearance from the surface's heatwave. When Ishijima issued the missiles to be fired upon the underground kingdom's satellite, the explosion caused Gomora II to be awakened. After struggling with Gomora's attacks, 80 used Succium Beam to kill the monster and its corpse was buried underground from an earthquake.
- Amoeba Monster Ameaza (アメーバ怪獣 アメーザ, Amēba Kaijū Amēza; 23): A space amoeba with the ability of self reproduction by latching into a victim, exhaling poison gas and firing energy beam. They invaded the Space 7 ship when it entered Planet Ameaza (アメーザ星, Amēza Sei; 23) of T28 Nebula and killed all of its crew members. The Space Mammy ship brought by UGM had Yamato dive in and willingly made the sacrifice to draw the ship towards an asteroid. He escaped by transforming into 80 and fought the remaining Ameaza that formed into a giant monster via Gigantified Energy (巨大化エネルギー, Kyodai-ka Enerugī) before killing them with Succium Beam.
- Valley Monster Cathy (渓谷怪獣 キャッシー, Keikoku Kaijū Kyasshī; 29): An ancient carnivorous monster with close resemblance to Ghostron from episode 8 of Return of Ultraman. Cathy was revered by the locals of Kiya Valley (鬼矢谷, Kiyadani) for its appearance once in 3 centuries and received its name in the present day by the village chief who wished to use the legend for tourist attraction in their village. Cathy awakened in the present day due to the sunlight and emerged from the mountain to feast on the village chief and his assistant. 80 spared the monster and brought it away from Kiya Valley where it continued sleeping in a different location. Cathy's main ability is to exhale 60,000 degree flame, however should the monster remain hungry, instead it exhale black smoke.
- Scrap Ghost Ship Barrack Ship (すくらっぷ幽霊船 バラックシップ, Sukurappu Yūreisen Barakku Shippu; 32): 15 years prior to the series, a carrier Queens (クイーンズ, Kuīnzu) was built as an experimental unmanned AI-guided ship sent on a route across the Strait of Magellan. After it crashed an iceberg and sank beneath the sea floor, the Queens returned and used the magnetic alloy it carried to assimilate with various ships and creating an armored body, now recognized as the monster Barrack Ship in its route to return to Japan. Yamato, Ikeda and Akira went to rescue Captain Yamamoto from the rogue ship as Space Mammy commenced attack but was incapable of fending against Barrack Ship's cannons. Yamato transformed into 80 and fired the Succium Beam after a long struggle in aerial combat.
- Crafted Monster Gazera (工作怪獣 ガゼラ, Kōsaku Kaijū Gazera; 33): A monster designed by a terminally ill young boy named Tetsuo, whose fears of surgery led him to create phony monster sightings. The crafted monster was turned into an actual one when it was possessed by the soul of a deceased monster. Initially appearing human-sized, Yamato's gunshots caused it to grow larger and countering the air forces and Ultraman 80 with stronger attacks. Through Kenichi's advise, 80 dislodged the amplifier on the chest as Gazera lost control and reduced to a hitodama, which 80 destroyed with Ultra Shot. Gazera's main ability is to adapt any incoming attacks and reusing them with twice the original strength. Its Monster Fire (モンスターファイヤー, Monstā Faiyā) attack is capable of melting diamonds and is linked to the amplifier on its chest. Gazera was made by the son of cinematographer Shinichi Ooka as an image of a monster created by a child.
- Strange Fish Angoras (怪魚 アンゴーラス, Kaigyo Angōrasu; 34): The child of a bigger Angoras that lived 20,000 meters beneath sea level in the offshore of Miura Peninsula. The fish was captured in Sagami Bay by a pair of fishermen and brought by Osamu to his home in Yokohama. It grew bigger by overnight and sent Sigma Wave (シグマ電波, Shiguma Denpa) to signal its parent of its location. Realizing their connection as family members, Ikeda reunited the young Angoras back to its parent.
  - Giant Strange Fish Angoras (巨大怪魚 アンゴーラス, Kyodai Kaigyo Angōrasu; 34): The parent of a young Angoras, it appeared nearby the Sagami Bay to search for its child and met with attacks from UGM aircraft. The monster had several fishing lines and was in a painful state. 80 stall and lured Angoras away from the fishing bay long enough to be reunited with its child and finally returning to the deep sea. As a bigger Angoras, it can swim at the speed of 100 km/h and squirt sea water.
- Parasitic Life Form Space-Plant (寄生生命体 宇宙植物, Kisei Seimei-tai Uchū Shokubutsu; 39): An unnamed 2 millimetre plant-like organism which originally started as a ball-like seed riding a small space saucer. The saucer broke and the seed was accidentally swallowed by Tetsuo, turning the boy into a monster. In order to revert Tetsuon back to his human form, 80 shrank himself into the monster's body and killed the Space-Plant with Succium Beam after a long struggle.
- Zero Fighter Monster Bird Barevadon (ゼロ戦怪鳥 バレバドン, Zerosen Kaichō Barebadon; 41): A giant biplane-looking space migratory bird monster that usually flies in the Ootori Valley within every 50 to 60 years. Due to its long trip, Barevadon usually eats anything, including human children due to their delicacy. Barevadon accidentally swallowed Takeo's radio-controlled aircraft and this turned the monster into a radio-controlled puppet that Takeo manipulated into his personal steed for joyride. As the radio-controlled aircraft exited the monster, Barevadon regained control and dropped Takeo from in mid-flight. 80 saved the boy in the nick of time, allowing Barevadon to resume its travel unharmed.
- Skull Monster Red King III (どくろ怪獣 レッドキング（三代目）, Dokuro Kaijū Reddo Kingu Sandaime; 46): A copy of the original Red King from episode 8 of Ultraman. The Red King was summoned by Marjin when one of the children wished for a monster, with Eleking and Woo among their contenders. Red King fought against 80 with the original monster's strength and fangs, but 80 managed to counter it with a series of throws. He destroyed Red King with Succium Beam, reducing it to pieces.
- Ultraviolet Ray Monster Gurobsku (紫外線怪獣 グロブスク, Shigaisen Kaijū Gurobusuku; 47): Originally a glove discarded by Tadashi in Western Tokyo, it was given life due to exposure from unfiltered UV ray. As the glove was given life from UV ray, Gurobsku can only remain active in the daylight and feed itself with the very same UV ray but developed aversion for infrared ray. The next day, it returned to a normal baseball glove but regain sentience upon exposure from the sunlight and threaten Tadashi's father before Ryōko shoots with Princess Ray. Continuous beams of infrared irritate Gurobsku further to the point of turning giant. At night, Takeshi and Ryōko traced an invisible Gurobsku to a quarry and fought the mutant glove as 80. After being defeated by Guts Power Ray, Gurobsku reverted into Tadashi's baseball glove.
