= Massimo =

Massimo (Italian: [ˈmassimo]) is a masculine Italian given name.

Notable people with the name include:

- Massimo Agostinelli (Max Agos) (born 1987), Swiss-based Italian American artist, entrepreneur and activist
- Massimo Agostini (born 1964), Italian football manager and former striker
- Massimo Alioto (born 1972), associate professor of Electrical and Computer Engineering at the National University of Singapore
- Massimo Allevi (born 1969), Italian pole vaulter
- Massimo Ambrosini (born 1977), Italian professional footballer
- Massimo De Ambrosis (born 1964), Italian actor and voice actor
- Massimo Amfiteatrof (1907–1990), Russian-born Italian cellist
- Paolo Massimo Antici (1924–2003), Italian diplomat, founder of the Antici Group
- Massimo Aparo (born 1953), Italian nuclear engineer
- Massimo Apollonio (born 1970), Italian racing cyclist
- Massimo Ardinghi (born 1971), professional tennis player from Italy
- Massimo Arduini (born 1960), Italian auto tourism racing driver
- Massimo Livi Bacci (born 1936), Italian professor of Demography
- Massimo Bacigalupo (born 1947), experimental filmmaker, scholar, translator of poetry, essayist, literary critic
- Massimo Baistrocchi (1942–2012), Italian writer, artist, freelance journalist, Italy's Ambassador to Namibia
- Massimo Ballestrero (born 1901, date of death unknown), Italian rowing coxswain
- Massimo Barbolini (born 1964), Italian volleyball coach
- Massimo Barbuti (born 1958), Italian football player and manager
- Massimo Bartolini (born 1962), Italian artist
- Massimo Battara (born 1963), Italian football coach and a former player
- Massimo Beghetto (born 1968), Italian football coach and former player
- Massimo Belardinelli (1938–2007), Italian comic artist
- Massimo Berdini (born 1958), Italian football player
- Massimo Bergami (born 1964), full professor of organizational behaviour at the University of Bologna
- Massimo Bergamin (born 1964), Italian politician
- Massimo Berta (1949–2020), Italian professional footballer
- Massimo Bertagnoli (born 1999), Italian football player
- Massimo Bertocchi (born 1985), decathlete from Canada
- Massimo Bertolini (born 1974), professional tennis player from Italy
- Massimo de Bertolis (born 1975), Italian professional cross-country mountain biker
- Massimo Biolcati (born 1972), Swedish-Italian-American jazz bassist
- Massimo Birindelli (born 1956), Italian sports shooter
- Massimo Bitonci (born 1965), Italian Venetist politician
- Massimo Bogana, Italian bobsledder
- Massimo Bogianckino (1922–2009), Italian pianist, artistic director, and politician
- Massimo Boldi (born 1945), Italian stand-up comedian and actor
- Massimo Bonanni (born 1982), Italian football coach and a former player
- Massimo Bonetti (born 1951), Italian actor and director
- Massimo Bonini (born 1959), Sammarinese professional football player and coach
- Massimo Boninsegni (born 1963), Italian-Canadian theoretical condensed matter physicist
- Massimo Bonomi (born 1967), Italian rugby union player and a sports manager
- Massimo Bontempelli (1878–1960), Italian poet, playwright, novelist and composer
- Massimo Borgobello (born 1971), Italian footballer
- Massimo Boscatto (born 1971), professional tennis player from Italy
- Massimo Bottura (born 1962), Italian restaurateur
- Massimo Brambati (born 1966), Italian footballer
- Massimo Brancaccio (1965–2005), Italian drag queen performer, stage name Billy More
- Massimo Bray (born 1959), Italian intellectual and politician
- Massimo Briaschi (born 1958), Italian professional footballer and FIFA sports agent
- Massimo Brunelli (born 1961), Italian cyclist
- Massimo Bruno (born 1993), Belgian footballer
- Massimo Bruschini (1942–1975), Italian boxer
- Massimo Bubola (born 1954), Italian singer-songwriter
- Massimo Bulleri (born 1977), Italian professional basketball player
- Massimo Busacca (born 1969), Swiss football referee
- Massimo Cacciari (born 1944), Italian philosopher, politician and public intellectual
- Fabio Massimo Cacciatori (born 1961), entrepreneur and film producer
- Massimo Calearo (born 1955), Italian entrepreneur and former politician
- Massimo Calvelli (born 1974), Italian sports executive and former professional tennis player
- Massimo Campigli (1895–1971), Italian painter and journalist
- Massimo Canevacci (born 1942), Italian academic, ethnographer and critical thinker
- Massimo Cannizzaro (born 1981), Italian football coach and former player
- Massimo Capra (born 1960), Italian-born Canadian restaurateur, cookbook author, celebrity chef
- Massimo De Carlo, Italian art dealer, with gallery spaces in Milan, London, and Hong Kong
- Massimo Carlotto (born 1956), Italian writer and playwright
- Massimo Carmassi (born 1943), Italian architect
- Massimo Carminati (born 1958), Italian underworld figure
- Massimo Carnevale (born 1967), Italian cartoonist and illustrator
- Massimo Carpegna (born 1955), Italian conductor
- Massimo Carraro (born 1959), Italian university professor, entrepreneur and politician from Veneto
- Massimo Carrera (born 1964), Italian professional football manager and former player
- Massimo Cartasegna (1885–1964), Italian athlete who competed at the 1908 Summer Olympics in London
- Massimo Casanova (born 1970), Italian politician and MEP
- Massimo Castagna (born 1961), Italian volleyball player
- Fabio Massimo Castaldo (born 1985), Italian politician and MEP
- Massimo Castellani (born 1961), Italian diver
- Massimo Di Cataldo (born 1968), Italian singer-songwriter and actor
- Massimo Cavaliere (born 1962), Italian fencer
- Massimo Ceccaroni (born 1968), Swiss-Italian footballer
- Massimo Ceccherini (born 1965), Italian actor, film director, comedian and screenwriter
- Massimo Ceciliani (born 1997), Italian rugby union player
- Massimo Cellino (born 1956), Italian entrepreneur and football club owner
- Massimo Cenci (born 1967), politician of San Marino
- Massimo Chessa (born 1988), professional Italian basketball player
- Massimo Cialente (born 1952), Italian politician and doctor
- Massimo Ciaramella (born 1970), Italian professional baseball infielder
- Massimo Ciavarro (born 1957), Italian actor and television personality
- Massimo Cierro (born 1964), professional tennis player from Italy
- Massimo Ciocci (born 1968), Italian professional football player and manager
- Massimo Cioffi (born 1997), Italian rugby union player
- Massimo Citi (born 1955), Italian science fiction writer and reviewer
- Massimo Coda (born 1988), Italian professional footballer
- Massimo Codol (born 1973), Italian racing cyclist
- Massimo Colaci (born 1985), Italian volleyball player
- Massimo Colomba (born 1977), Swiss footballer
- Massimo Consoli (1945–2007), known as the father of the Italian gay movement
- Massimo Bruni Corvino (died 1522), Roman Catholic prelate, Bishop of Isernia
- Massimo Corvo (born 1959), Italian actor and voice actor
- Massimo Cosmelli (born 1943), Italian basketball player
- Massimo Costantini (born 1958), Italian table tennis player
- Massimo Crippa (born 1965), Italian footballer
- Massimo Cristaldi (1956–2022), Italian film producer
- Massimo Cuttitta (1966–2021), Italian professional rugby union player and coach
- Massimo D'Alelio (1916–1998), Italian bridge player
- Massimo D'Alema (born 1949), Italian politician
- Massimo Dallamano (1917–1976), Italian director and director of photography
- Massimo D'Amico (born 1979), Italian artist working in the Czech Republic
- Massimo Dapporto (born 1945), Italian actor and voice actor
- Massimo Dell'Acqua (born 1979), professional tennis player from Italy
- Massimo Demarin (born 1979), Croatian professional cyclist
- Massimo Depaoli (born 1959), Italian politician
- Massimo Di Deco, Italian coxswain
- Massimo Di Domenico (born 1945), professional tennis player from Italy
- Massimo Di Gesu (born 1970), Italian composer
- Massimo Dobrovic, Istrian Italian actor
- Massimo Donadi (born 1963), Italian politician
- Massimo Donati (born 1981), Italian football coach, pundit and former professional player
- Massimo Donati (cyclist) (born 1967), Italian professional racing cyclist
- Massimo Drago (born 1971), Italian professional football coach and a former player
- Massimo Drisaldi, Italian tennis player
- Massimo Egidi (born 1942), Italian economist
- Massimo Ellul, Maltese businessman active in the voluntary organisation field
- Massimo Fabbrizi (born 1977), Italian professional target shooter
- Massimo Faggioli (born 1970), Italian Church historian, professor of theology and religious studies at Villanova University
- Massimo Fagioli (1931–2017), Italian psychiatrist and psychotherapist
- Massimo Federici (born 1956), Italian politician
- Massimo Felisatti (1932–2016), Italian novelist, essayist, screenwriter, and director
- Massimo Fenati (born 1969), Italian comic book artist, illustrator and animator
- Massimo Ferrin (born 1998), Canadian professional soccer player
- Massimo Ficcadenti (born 1967), Italian football manager and former midfielder
- Massimo Fink (1896–1956), Italian bobsledder
- Massimo Florioli (born 1972), Italian professional golfer
- Massimo Altomare (m:A Fog) (born 1979), heavy metal musician
- Massimo Fondelli (born 1954), Italian water polo player
- Pier Massimo Forni (1951–2018), Italian professor at Johns Hopkins University
- Massimo Fornoni (born 1989), Italian footballer
- Massimo Foschi (born 1938), Italian actor and voice actor
- Massimo Franciosa (1924–1998), Italian screenwriter and film director
- Massimo Franco (born 1954), Italian journalist, author, edits the Italian newspaper Corriere della Sera
- Massimo Freccia (1906–2004), Italian American conductor
- Massimo Gadda (born 1963), Italian professional football coach and former player
- Massimo Ganci (born 1981), Italian footballer
- Massimo Garavaglia (born 1968), Italian politician, Italian Minister of Tourism
- Massimo Gauci (1774–1854), Maltese lithographer and painter active in the UK
- Massimo Gazzoli (born 1975), Italian football goalkeeper
- Massimo Ghini (born 1954), Italian actor
- Massimo Iosa Ghini (born 1959), Italian architect, designer and professor
- Massimo Ghirotto (born 1961), Italian road bicycle racer
- Massimo Giacomini (born 1939), Italian football player and football manager
- Massimo Giacoppo (born 1983), Italian water polo player, member of Olympic medallist team
- Massimo Severo Giannini (1915–2000), Italian politician and jurist
- Massimo Giletti (born 1962), Italian television host and journalist
- Massimo Giordano (born 1971), Italian-born operatic tenor
- Massimo Giorgetti (born 1959), Italian politician
- Massimo Di Giorgio (born 1958), Italian high jumper
- Massimo Giovanelli (born 1967), Italian rugby union player
- Massimo Girotti (1918–2003), Italian film actor whose career spanned seven decades
- Massimo Giuliani (born 1951), Italian actor and voice actor
- Massimo Giunti (born 1974), Italian cyclist
- Massimo Giustetti (1926–2012), the Catholic bishop of the Diocese of Biella, Italy
- Massimo Gobbi (born 1980), Italian footballer
- Massimo Goh (born 1999), Italian footballer
- Massimo Gotti (born 1986), Italian professional footballer
- Massimo Gramellini (born 1960), Italian writer and journalist working at Corriere della Sera
- Massimo Graziato (born 1988), Italian professional road cyclist
- Massimo Grima (born 1979), professional footballer
- Massimo Guglielmi (born 1970), Italian lightweight rower
- Massimo Guiggiani (born 1956), Italian mechanical engineer, professor of applied mechanics at the Università di Pisa
- Massimo Introvigne (born 1955), Italian Roman Catholic sociologist of religion and intellectual property attorney
- Massimo Di Ioia (born 1987), Canadian soccer player
- Massimo Lana (born 1962), Italian lightweight rower
- Umberto Massimo Lattuca (born 1959), Italian professional football player
- Massimo Liverani (born 1961), Italian rally driver and co-driver
- Massimo Livi Bacci (born 1936), Italian politician and statistician
- Massimo Lodolo (born 1959), Italian actor and voice actor
- Massimo Lombardo (born 1973), Swiss footballer
- Massimo Lonardi (born 1953), Italian lutenist
- Massimo Lopez (born 1952), Italian actor, voice actor, comedian, impressionist
- Massimo Lotti (born 1969), Italian footballer
- Massimo Loviso (born 1984), Italian footballer
- Massimo De Luca (born 1987), Italian futsal player
- Massimo Luongo (born 1992), Australian footballer
- Massimo Maccarone (born 1979), Italian football coach and former player
- Massimo Maffezzoli (born 1976), Italian basketball head coach
- Massimo Magnani (born 1951), Italian marathon runner
- Massimo Mallegni (born 1968), Italian politician
- Massimo Manca (born 1964), Italian-born American football kicker
- Valerio Massimo Manfredi (born 1943), Italian historian, writer, essayist, archaeologist and journalist
- Massimo Mannelli (born 1956), Italian professional golfer
- Massimo Marazzina (born 1974), Italian professional footballer
- Massimo Marchese (born 1965), Italian musician, lutenist, theorbist and recording artist
- Massimo Marchiori (born 1970), Italian mathematician and computer scientist
- Massimo Marconcini (born 1968), Italian rower
- Massimo Margiotta (born 1977), Italian-Venezuelan professional footballer
- Massimo Marino (cyclist) (born 1954), Italian cyclist
- Massimo Marino (TV presenter) (1960–2019), Italian television presenter and actor
- Massimo Mariotti (born 1961), Swiss footballer
- Massimo De Martin (born 1983), Italian professional football player
- Massimo Martino (born 1990), Luxembourgian football player
- Massimo Mascioletti (born 1958), Italian rugby union coach and a former player
- Massimo Masini (born 1945), Italian professional basketball player and coach
- Massimo Massimi (1877–1954), Italian Roman Catholic cardinal
- Massimo Mattioli (1943–2019), Italian artist and cartoonist
- Massimo Maugeri, Italian writer, journalist and radio presenter
- Massimo Mauro (born 1962), Italian politician and a former professional football player
- Massimo Mazzucco (born 1954), Italian filmmaker
- Massimo Meola (born 1953), Italian footballer
- Massimo Mida (1917–1992), Italian screenwriter and film director
- Massimo Mila (1910–1988), Italian musicologist, music critic, intellectual and anti-fascist
- Massimo Milano (born 1967), ethnomusicologist, critic and sound experimentalist
- Massimo Minervin (born 1939), Italian Olympic sailor
- Massimo Minetti (born 1978), Italian footballer
- Massimo Mirabelli (born 1991), Canadian soccer player
- Massimo Moia (born 1987), Belgian football midfielder
- Massimo Mollica (1929–2013), Italian actor and stage director
- Massimo Mongai (1950–2016), Italian author of science fiction
- Massimo Montanari, Professor of Medieval History at Bologna University
- Massimo Monti (born 1962), Italian racing driver
- Massimo Morales (born 1964), Italian football manager
- Massimo Morante (1952–2022), Italian musician, guitar player for Goblin
- Massimo Moratti (born 1945), Italian billionaire petroleum businessman
- Massimo Moriconi (canoeist) (born 1956), Italian sprint canoeist
- Massimo Moriconi (musician) (born 1955), Italian bassist
- Massimo Morsello (1958–2001), Italian fascist political and singer-songwriter
- Massimo Murdocca (born 1984), Australian professional soccer player
- Massimo Mutarelli (born 1978), Italian football midfielder
- Massimo Natili (1935–2017), racing driver from Italy
- Massimo Nistri (born 1955), Italian Olympic backstroke swimmer
- Massimo Oberti (1901–1972), Italian sailor
- Massimo Oddo (born 1976), Italian footballer
- Massimo Orlando (born 1971), Italian professional football coach and a former player
- Massimo Ornatelli (born 1986), Italian footballer
- Massimo Osti (1944–2005), Italian garment engineer and fashion designer
- Massimo Pacetti (born 1962), Canadian politician from Quebec
- Massimo Paci (born 1978), Italian football coach and a former player
- Massimo Paganin (born 1970), Italian professional footballer
- Massimo Palanca (born 1953), Italian football striker
- Massimo Palazzi (born 1961), the secretary general of the Italian Muslim Assembly, Khalifah for Europe of the Qadiri Sufi Order
- Massimo Pallottino (1909–1995), Italian archaeologist specializing in Etruscan civilization and art
- Massimo Palombella (born 1967), Italian Salesian priest and director of the Cappella Musicale Pontificia Sistina
- Massimo Panizzi (born 1962), Italian Army Major General, Italian Deputy Military Representative to the NATO Military Committee
- Massimo Paradiso (born 1968), Italian rower
- Massimo Cantini Parrini (born 1971), Italian costume designer
- Massimo Parziani (born 1992), Italian Grand Prix motorcycle racer
- Massimo Pedrazzini (born 1958), Italian football coach and former player
- Massimo Pellegrini (born 1966), Italian professional footballer
- Massimo Pessina (born 2007), Italian footballer
- Massimo Pianforini (1890–1966), Italian film and television actor
- Massimo Pigliucci (born 1964), Italian-American Philosopher
- Massimo Pigoli (born 1958), Italian auto racing driver
- Massimo Piloni (born 1948), Italian professional football coach and a former player
- Massimo Pilotti (1879–1962), Italian jurist and judge
- Massimo Pirri (1945–2001), Italian film director and screenwriter
- Massimo del Pizzo, Italian science fiction writer and critic
- Massimo Podenzana (born 1961), Italian road racing cyclist
- Massimo Podestà, Italian artist and architect
- Massimo Polidoro (born 1969), Italian psychologist, writer, journalist, co-founder and executive director of CICAP
- Massimo Popolizio (born 1961), Italian actor and voice actor
- Massimo Porrati (born 1961), professor of physics, member of the Center for Cosmology and Particle Physics at New York University
- Massimo Pupillo (1922 – c. 1999), Italian film director
- Massimo Quiriconi (born 1963), Italian race walker
- Massimo Ranieri (born Giovanni Calone, 1951), Italian pop singer, film and stage actor
- Massimo Rastelli (born 1968), Italian football manager and former player
- Massimo Ravazzolo (born 1972), Italian rugby union player and a current coach
- Massimo Rigoni (born 1961), Italian ski jumper
- Massimo Rinaldi (1869–1941), Italian Roman Catholic bishop of Rieti
- Massimo Rivola (born 1971), Italian motorsport official
- Massimo Rizzo (born 1974), Swiss football manager and former player
- Massimo Rizzo (born 2001), Canadian ice hockey player
- Massimo Roccoli (born 1984), Italian motorbike rider
- Massimo Rosa (born 1995), Italian mountain bike racer
- Massimo Rosi (1944–1995), Italian swimmer
- Massimo Rotundo (born 1955), Italian comics artist
- Massimo Sacchetti, eclectic contemporary Italian artist
- Massimo Sacchi (born 1950), Italian swimmer
- Massimo Salvadè (born 1971), Italian figure skater
- Massimo Salvadori (1908–1992), British-Italian historian and anti-Fascist
- Massimo Sammartino (born 1995), Italian footballer
- Massimo Sandi (born 2002), Peruvian footballer
- Massimo De Santis (born 1962), Italian football referee
- Massimo Sarmi (born 1948), Italian businessman
- Massimo Savić (1962–2022), Croatian pop singer, also known mononymously as Massimo
- Massimo Scaglione (1931–2015), Italian television director, writer and politician
- Massimo Scali (born 1979), Italian competitive ice dancer
- Massimo Scaligero (1906–1980), Italian spiritual teacher and member of "Gruppo di Ur"
- Massimo Scarpa (born 1970), Italian professional golfer
- Massimo Scolari (born 1943), Italian architect, painter and designer
- Massimo Serato, born Giuseppe Segato, (1916–1989), Italian film actor
- Massimo Sica, convicted triple murderer
- Massimo Sigala (born 1951), Italian racing driver and co-founder of Trident Racing
- Massimo Silva (born 1951), Italian professional football coach and a former player
- Massimo Stano (born 1992), Italian racewalker
- Massimo Stanzione (1585–1656), Italian Baroque painter
- Massimo Storgato (born 1961), Italian professional football coach and a former player
- Massimo Strazzer (born 1969), Italian professional cyclist
- Massimo Sulli (born 1963), Italian Olympic judoka
- Massimo Susic (born 1967), Italian professional footballer
- Massimo Taibi (born 1970), Italian professional footballer
- Massimo Tamburini (1943–2014), Italian motorcycle designer for Cagiva, Ducati, and MV Agusta
- Michele Massimo Tarantini (born 1942), Italian film director
- Massimo Tarantino (born 1971), Italian professional football player
- Massimo Tazzer (born 1999), Italian professional footballer
- Massimo Teglio (1900–1990), Italian aviator
- Massimo Teodori (born 1938), Italian author and politician
- Massimo Terzano (1892–1947), Italian cinematographer
- Massimo Tononi (born 1964), Italian banker and politician
- Massimo Trella (1932–2002), Italian engineer
- Massimo Trevisan (born 1968), Italian freestyle Olympic swimmer
- Massimo Troiano (died 1570), Italian composer, poet, chronicler of life at the court of Duke Albrecht V of Bavaria
- Massimo Troisi (1953–1994), Italian actor, screenwriter, and film director
- Massimo Santoro Tubito (born 1660), Italian priest and writer
- Massimo Andrea Ugolini (born 1978), politician and Captain Regent of San Marino
- Massimo Urbani (1957–1993), Italian jazz alto saxophonist
- Massimo Valeri (born 1972), professional tennis player from Italy
- Massimo Vanni (born 1946), Italian film and television actor
- Massimo Venier (born 1967), Italian film director and screenwriter
- Massimo Venturiello (born 1957), Italian actor and voice actor
- Massimo Vergassola, Italian physicist, currently at the University of California
- Massimo Vigliar (born 1949), Italian film producer
- Massimo Vignelli (1931–2014), Italian designer
- Massimo Vitali (born 1944), Italian photographer
- Massimo Volta (born 1987), Italian professional footballer
- Massimo Wertmüller (born 1956), Italian actor
- Massimo Wilde (1944–2017), Italian politician
- Massimo Zanetti (born 1948), Italian entrepreneur and former politician
- Massimo Zappino (born 1981), Brazilian footballer of Italian descent
- Massimo Zedda (born 1976), Italian politician, Mayor of Cagliari
- Massimo Zucchelli (born 1972), Italian alpine skier

Fictional characters with the name include:

- Massimo Marone, on The Bold and the Beautiful
- Don Massimo Torricelli, one of the main characters in 365 Days

== See also ==
- Massimo (surname)
- Massimino
- Maxim (given name), the equivalent name in Slavic languages
- Maxime, the equivalent name in French
- Maximus (disambiguation), the equivalent Roman name
