= Sacchetti =

Sacchetti may refer to:

== People ==
- House of Sacchetti, a noble Italian family
- Arturo Sacchetti (born 1941), Italian organist, conductor and musicologist
- Dardano Sacchetti (born 1944), Italian screenwriter
- Francesco Sacchetti (died c. 1473), Italian doctor and professor
- Franco Sacchetti (c. 1330–c. 1400), Italian poet and novelist
- Cardinal Giulio Cesare Sacchetti (1586–1663), unsuccessfully nominated by France for Pope in 1644 and 1655
- Ivano Sacchetti, Italian financial manager and criminal
- Massimo Sacchetti, Italian artist
- Romeo Sacchetti (born 1953), Italian basketball coach and player

== Other ==
- Sacchettoni, a type of pasta also called sacchetti
