= Berdini =

Berdini is an Italian surname. Notable people with the surname include:

- Albert Berdini of Sarteano (1385–1450), Franciscan friar and preacher
- Massimo Berdini (born 1958), Italian footballer

== See also ==
- Bernini (surname)
