= Massimo (disambiguation) =

Massimo a masculine Italian given name

Massimo may also refer to:

- Massimo (surname), an Italian surname
- Massimo family, Roman princely family
- Istituto Massimiliano Massimo, Jesuit school in Rome
- San Massimo, municipality in Campobasso, Molise, Italy
- Circo Massimo (Rome Metro), Roman metro station
- Teatro Massimo, opera house in Palermo
- Villa Massimo, German cultural institution in Rome
- Villa Massimo alle Terme Diocleziane
- The Italian Baker (doing business as Massimo), a Malaysian bakery

== See also ==
- Palazzo Massimo (disambiguation)
- Maximo (disambiguation)
