= Massino =

Massino is a surname. Notable people with the surname include:

- Emilio Massino (1925–2013), Italian sailor
- Joseph Massino (1943–2023), American mobster

== See also ==
- Masino, surname
- Massimo (disambiguation)
- Massino Visconti, municipality in the Province of Novara, in the Italian region of Piedmont
