= Meola =

Meola is an Italian surname. Notable people with the surname include:

- Antonio Meola (born 1990), Italian footballer
- Edgardo di Meola (1950–2005), Argentine footballer
- Eric Meola (born 1946), American photographer
- Massimo Meola (born 1953), Italian footballer
- Mike Meola (1905–1976), American baseball player
- Tony Meola (born 1969), American soccer player

== See also ==
- Al Di Meola (born 1954), American musician
- Meola Glacier, a glacier of Uttarakhand, India
