= Maugeri =

Maugeri is a surname. Notable people with the surname include:

- Francesco Maugeri (1898–1978), Italian admiral
- Leonardo Maugeri (1964–2017), Italian oil and gas expert
- Massimo Maugeri (born 1968), Italian writer
- Mauro Maugeri (1959–2017), Italian water polo coach and player
