= Torneo notturno =

Opera by Gian Francesco Malipiero

Torneo notturno (Nocturnal Tournament) is an opera by the Italian composer Gian Francesco Malipiero. It was first performed at the Nationaltheater in Munich on 15 May 1931. The libretto, by the composer, is based on works by Serafino Aquilano, Francesco Sacchetti and Tuscan folk songs.

The work is made up of seven scenes or notturni linked by instrumental interludes. The titles of the notturni are:

1. Le serenate
2. La tormenta
3. La foresta
4. La taverna del buon tempo
5. Il focolare spento
6. Il castello della noia
7. La prigione

== Roles ==
Role	Voice type	Premiere cast 15 May 1931 (Conductor: Karl Elmendorff)
Il Disperato ("The Despairing One")	tenor	E.Feuge
Lo Spensierato ("The Carefree One")	baritone	W.Härtl
Innamorato 1 (First lover)	tenor	H.Rehkemper
Innamorato 2 (Second lover)	baritone	A.Gerzer
Innamorato 3 (Third lover)	bass	J.Fornau
La madre (the mother)	mezzo-soprano	G.Langer
La figlia (the daughter)	soprano	C.Sendel
L'oste (the landlord)	baritone	H.Fichtmüller
La cortigiana (the courtesan)	soprano	A.Wagenpfeil
Il buffone (the buffoon)	baritone	Julius Betetto
Quattro giovani (four youths)	tenor	

== Sources ==
- The Viking Opera Guide ed. Holden (1993)
- Del Teatro (in Italian)
