= Panizzi =

Panizzi is an Italian surname. Notable people with the surname include:

- Anthony Panizzi (1797–1879), Italian-born naturalized British librarian
- Erik Panizzi (born 1994), Italian footballer
- Gilles Panizzi (born 1965), French rally driver
- Massimo Panizzi (born 1962), Italian Army Major General
