= Plato and Diogenes (Preti) =

Painting by Mattia Preti

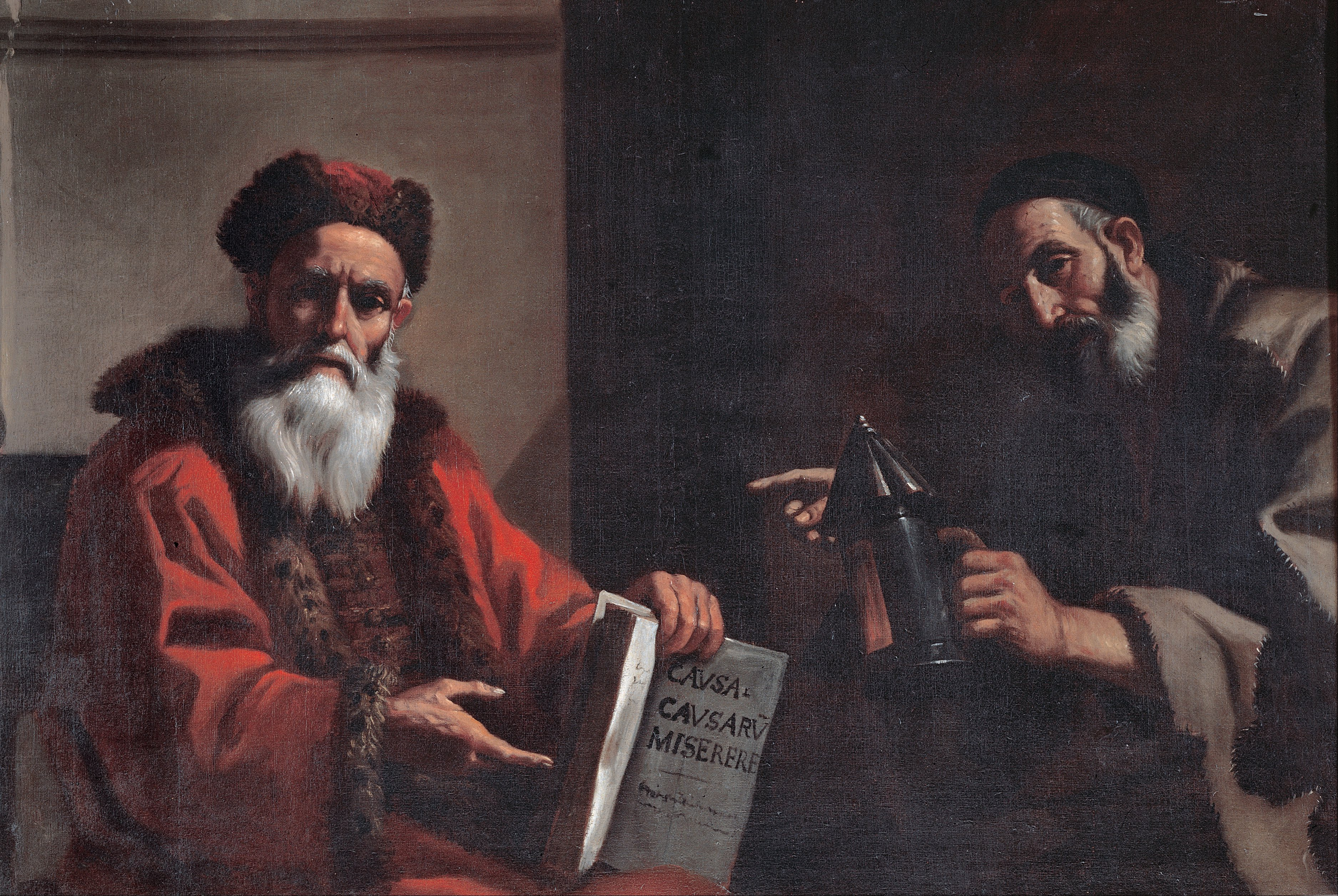
- Artist: Mattia Preti
- Year: c. 1688
- Medium: Oil on canvas
- Location: Sala IX, Galleria Cini, Pinacoteca of Capitoline Museum; Rome

The Plato and Diogenes is an oil on canvas painting by the Italian Baroque painter Mattia Preti, executed c. 1688. It is housed in the Pinacoteca of the Capitoline Museum in Rome.

== Description ==
The painting is listed in 1688 inventories of the Sacchetti collections; but not attributed to Preti until 1725. It was painted to hang alongside a painting by the same artist depicting two other Greek philosophers, Heraclitus and Democritus, now found in the Pinacoteca Vaticana. The scholarly Plato is depicted dressed in a fine fur coat against a wall, displaying one of his texts, while Diogenes, in a drab cloak, holds a lamp in the darkness, and points to Plato.
