= Masino =

Masino is a surname and given name. Notable people with the name include:

== Surname ==
- Al Masino (1928–2006), American basketball player
- Denise Masino (born 1968), American bodybuilder
- Paola Masino (1908–1989), Italian writer
- Paul Masino (1911–1993), French gymnast

== Given name ==
- Masino Intaray (1943–2013), Filipino poet and musician

== See also ==
- Masino Castle, castle in Italy
- Massino, surname
- Val Masino, Italian commune
