= Palazzo Massimo =

Palazzo Massimo may refer to:

- Palazzo Massimo alle Colonne, a Renaissance palace in Rome, Italy
- Palazzo Massimo alle Terme, a palace in Rome, Italy
- Palazzo Massimo di Pirro, Renaissance palace in Rome

== See also ==
- Massimo (disambiguation)
