= Bernini (surname) =

Bernini is a surname. Notable people with the surname include:

- Andrea Bernini (born 1973), Italian footballer
- Anna Maria Bernini (born 1965), Italian politician
- Carlo Bernini (1936–2011), Italian politician and businessman
- Dante Bernini (1922–2019), Italian Roman Catholic prelate
- Domenico Bernini (fl. 1685–1717), Italian priest, son of Gian Lorenzo Bernini
- Ferdinando Bernini (1910–1992), Italian sports shooter
- Franco Bernini (born 1954), Italian director and screenwriter
- Giacomo Bernini (born 1989), Italian rugby union player
- Gian Lorenzo Bernini (1598–1680), Italian sculptor and architect, son of Pietro Bernini
- Giorgio Bernini (1928–2020), Italian jurist, academic and politician
- Giuseppe Maria Bernini (1709–1761), Italian Capuchin missionary
- Luigi Bernini (1612–1681), engineer, architect and sculptor
- Pietro Bernini (1562–1629), Italian sculptor
- Rosalba Bernini (1762/3–1829), Italian pastellist
