= Massimo (surname) =

Massimo is an Italian surname. Notable people with the name include:

- Alessio Di Massimo (born 1996), Italian professional footballer
- Annella di Massimo (1613–1649), Italian painter, active in Naples
- Camillo Massimo (1620–1677), Italian cardinal
- Domenico Massimo (1630 –1685), Roman Catholic prelate
- Emiliano Massimo (born 1989), Italian footballer
- Franco Massimo (born 1968), English former professional footballer
- Luisa Massimo (1928–2016), Italian pediatrician
- Massimiliano Massimo (died 1911), Italian Jesuit
- Melina Laboucan-Massimo, advocate for climate justice and Indigenous rights
- Roberto Massimo (born 2000), German professional footballer

== See also ==
- Massimo
- Massimo (disambiguation)
