= Massimo Tazzer =

Italian footballer

Personal information
- Date of birth: 28 May 1999 (age 27)
- Place of birth: Genoa, Italy
- Height: 1.76 m (5 ft 9 in)
- Position: Right back

Youth career
- Genoa

Senior career*
Years	Team	Apps	(Gls)
2018–2019	Genoa	0	(0)
2018–2019	→ Ponsacco (loan)	35	(0)
2019–2022	Monopoli	55	(1)
2022–2023	Gubbio	19	(0)
- * Club domestic league appearances and goals as of 23 April 2023

Massimo Tazzer (born 28 May 1999) is an Italian professional footballer who plays as a right back.

== Club career ==
Born in Genoa, Tazzer started his career in local club Genoa C.F.C. He played two seasons for the Primavera team. For the 2018–19 season, he was loaned to Serie D club Ponsacco, and Tazzer made his senior debut.

On 24 August 2019, he signed with Serie C club Monopoli. On 19 February 2020, he extended his contract with the club.

On 26 January 2022, he joined Serie C club Gubbio.
