= Rosalba Bernini =

Italian artist (1762/3–1829)

Rosalba Adelaide Clorinda Bernini (1762/3–1829) was an Italian pastellist.

Born in Parma, Bernini was the daughter of the Roman Clemente Bernini and his wife Giuditta Olgiati. She worked in her birth town for some while, producing botanical watercolors and adding two volumes to her father's Ornitologia dell'Europa meridionale, which today may be found in the Biblioteca Palatina. She was also named an honorary member of the Accademia Clementina. In 1781 she married a Signor Corci and moved to Milan, where she is known to have still been active in 1812. As a pastellist Bernini produced mainly portraits. Johann Zoffany was active in Parma during the early part of her career, and her early pieces are said to bear some resemblance to his. She died in Milan.
