= Sacchetti family =

Italian noble family

Coat of arms of the Sacchetti

The Sacchetti family is an Italian noble family originating in Tuscany, whose earliest documented member Merlo lived during the late 10th and early 11th centuries. The name of the family is derived from one or more members known as Sacchetto. According to Ugolino di Vieri (1438–1516),"nobile Sacchetti genus est, moenia primus romanus sangius".

In the 19th century, Luigi Sacchetti (1863-1936) son of Urbano Sacchetti, marchese di Castelromano and Principessa Beatrice Orsini upon his marriage to Maria Colonna Barberini-Colonna, daughter of Enrico Barberini-Colonna and Teresa Orsini inherited the title of Prince of Palestrina and permission to use the Barberini name.

== History ==
The 17th century author, Eugenio Gamurrini in his Istoria genealogica delle famiglie nobili toscane et umbre (1668–1685) claimed with little evidence that this family, like many others in Florence, had roots in prominent Roman families. He claimed the family derived from the "gens Cornelia", one of the most distinguished families of the Roman Republic, from who arose in 485 BC the consul Servius Cornelius Cossus Maluginensis. According to Gamurrini the Sacchetti descend from the Cornelii Merulae branch.

The family was certainly well established in Florence during the 12th century. Dante Alighieri mentions the family in The Divine Comedy, Paradise Canto XVI in which Dante's great-grandfather, Cacciaguida degli Elisei (c.1098 – c. 1148), lists the ancient families of Florence In The Inferno, Canto XXIX:1–36, Dante recounted meeting his father's first cousin, Geri del Bello. He had been condemned to the ninth chasm for his disputes with the Sacchetti, most likely Brodaio Sacchetti, consul in 1203. At the time of Dante's vision the feud had not been settled. The families were finally reconciled in 1342.

=== Florentine Origins ===
According to Ugolino di Vieri the Sacchetti were among the families forced to relocate from Fiesole to Florence after the former was conquered in 1125.

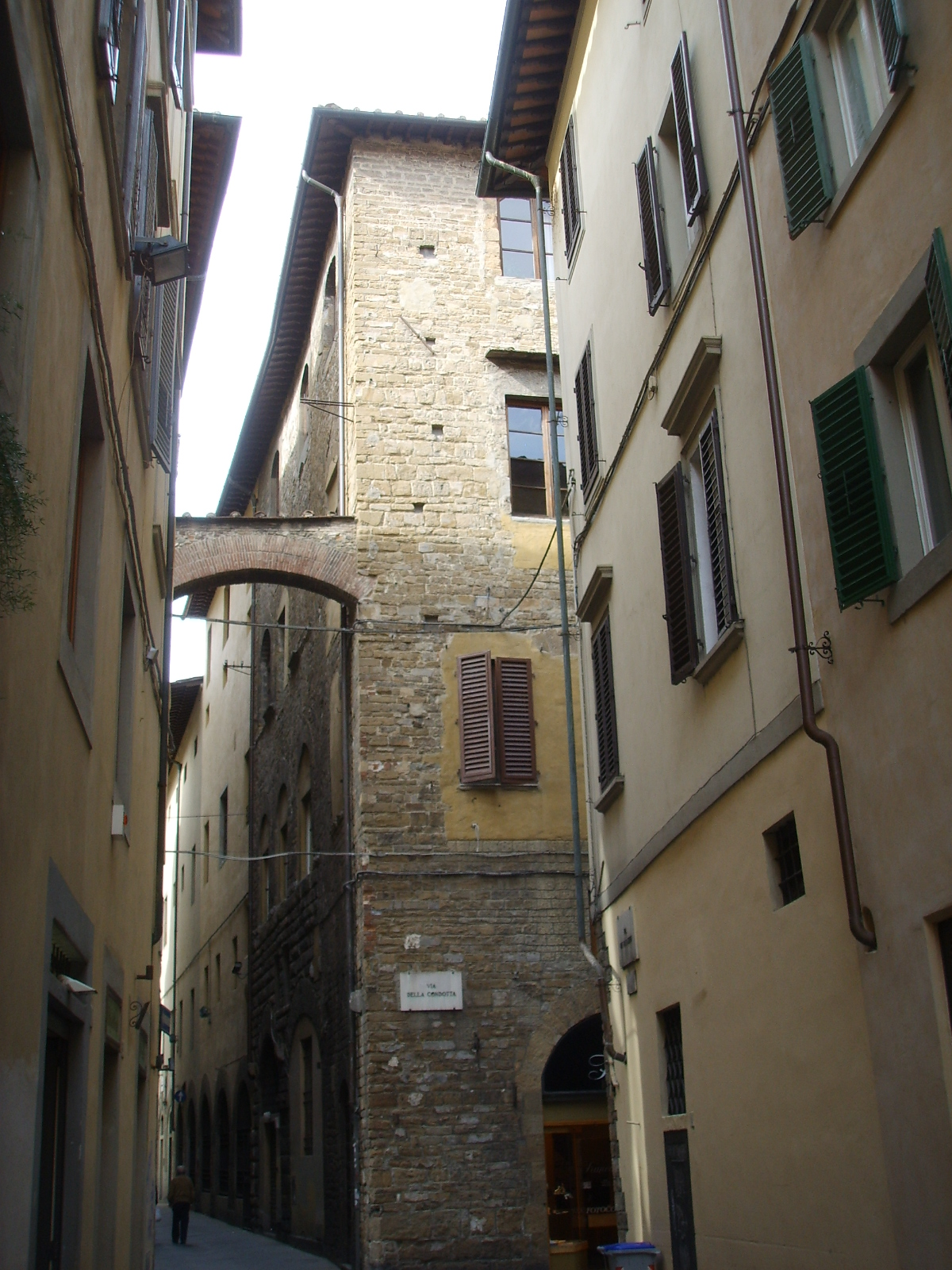
The Tower of the Sacchetti. The intersection of via della Condotta and via dei Magazzini

In 1137, the earliest document asserts Sacchetto and his brother Bernardino di Bonizo di Merlo contract a tower association with the Uberti family.(Strozziane Uguccioni, August 11, 1137). It was the descendants of Sacchetto that would eventually use this as a patronymic and become known as the Sacchetti. In 1197, Brodaio di Sacchetto was elected to the Council of the Florentine Republic. and in 1202, Consul. While Cingisallo and Albizzo di Rovinoso are listed among the Anziani for the year 1200. When Florentine society was divided between the political factions of the Guelf and the Ghibellines most members of the family sided with the Guelf party. In 1260 the Teghiaio and Giambeto Sacchetti fought in the Battle of Montaperti against Ghibelline Siena while Gaglia di Upizzino Sacchetti was one of the men charged with defending the Carroccio, a wheeled altar which was the rallying point for a medieval army. The Sienese defeated the Florentines and the Sacchetti were exiled but later returned with the eventual defeat of the Sienese and the final expulsion of the Florentine Ghibellines. Despite the family's support for Guelf party, the Sacchetti were barred from public office in the Ordinances of Justice in 1293 and 1295. The ordinances were intended to exclude Ghibelline sympathizers and nobles with a reputation for their bellicose nature and a predilection for violence to impose their will. Eventually the family returned to the council and the highest offices of the Republic. Antonio di Forese Sacchetti was appointed by the Signoria on July 7, 1375 as one of the eight members of a committee, that became known as the "Otto dei Preti" (Eight Priests), to carry out the taxation of the clergy in Florence and Fiesole. The tax was a forced loan to pay for the nonaggression pact with the mercenary Sir John Hawkwood at a cost of 130,000 florins. Antonio with the other members were excommunicated by Pope Gregory XI.

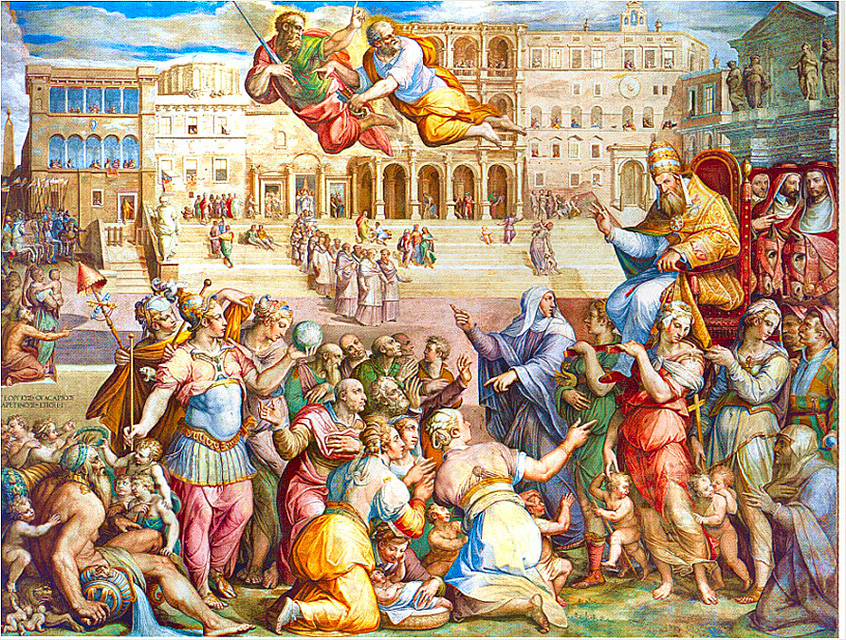
Gregory XI excommunicated Antonio di Forese Sacchetti and the other the members of the committee of The Eight Priests on the March 31, 1376 .

The family has two main branches, one that remained in Florence up to the time of the hegemony of the Medici and relocated to Rome in the sixteenth century and the Neapolitan branch that went into the service of the Normans in southern Italy shortly after their forced transfer from Fiesole.

== Neapolitan branch ==
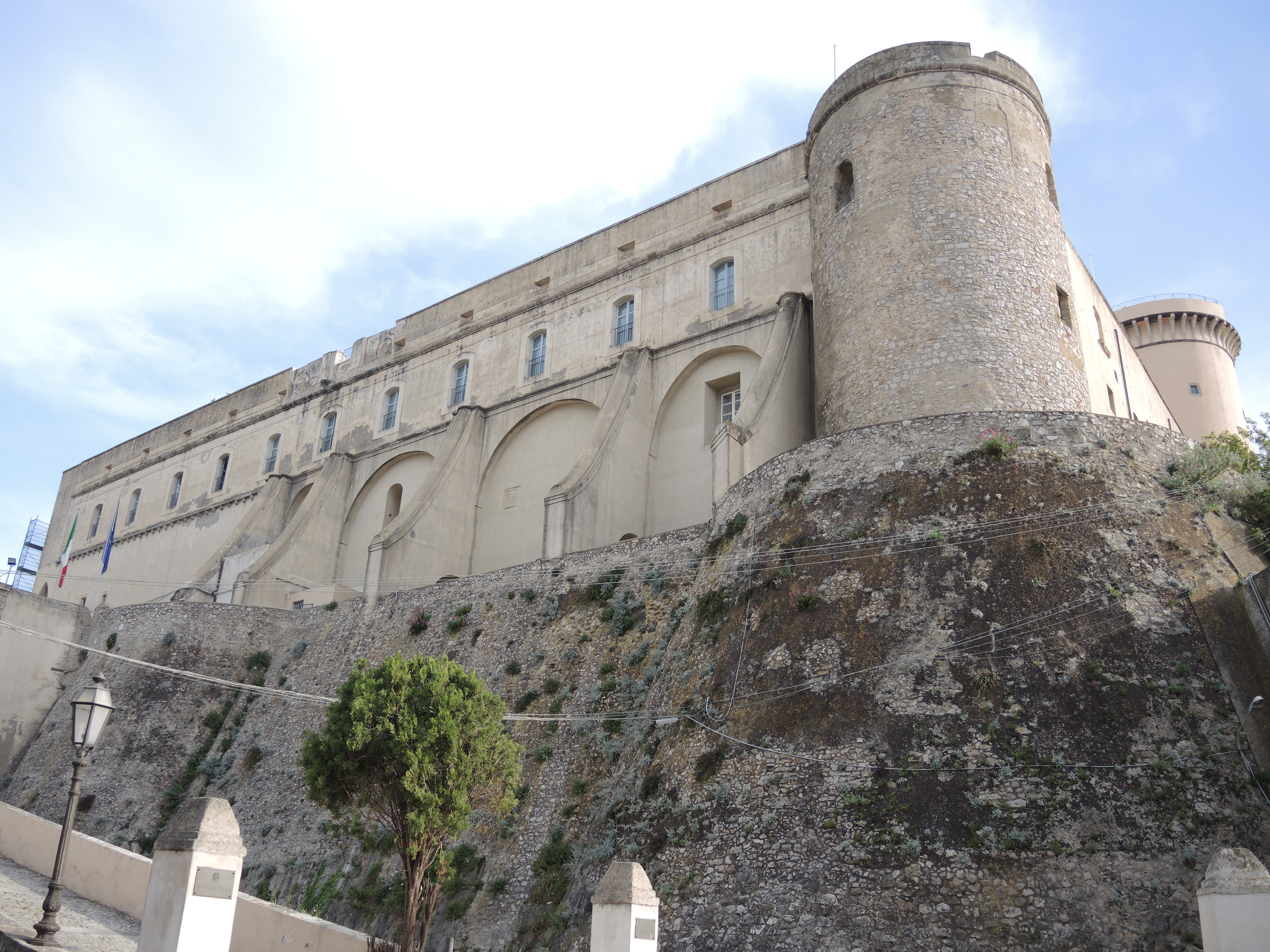
The Castle of Gaeta, Angelo Sacchetti was appointed Castellan in 1267.

The Neapolitan branch of the family trace their descent to the brothers Lancillotto and Avellino di Sacchetto. Early records show that following the death of Langelotto Sacchetti—a military captain and Great Baron over lands including Alessano, Ceglie, and Cuperano—the Norman King Roger II of Sicily appointed Avellino to his deceased brother's military positions and baronial estates on September 23, 1146. Other early prominent family members included Lancillotto's nephew Cesare, who served as Bishop of Melfi, and Ottone Sacchetti, the Latin Patriarch of Antioch. Avellino also received distinct royal privileges from King Roger II, who appointed him Gran Giustiziere (Grand Justiciar) of the kingdom.

In 1173, King William the Good granted Avellino's grandson, Garzalino (Gezzolino), the Grand Ostiarius (Grand Doorkeeper) of the Kingdom, the Barony of Alessano alongside eleven additional southern fiefdoms, including Ceglie, Campi, Cavallino, Stellino, Ginosa, Castrignano, Cevarano, Melendugno, Massafra, and Squinzano. Garzalino's son, Ludovico, married Emilia Acciaioli; their son Alberico served as Praetor of Tusculum in 1224 under Holy Roman Emperor Frederick II.

Subsequent generations held high-ranking administrative, legal, and military offices under the Angevin and Aragonese monarchs:

- Angelo Sacchetti (son of the late Alberico) was appointed Castellan and Governor of Gaeta with an annual salary of 300 florins on February 24, 1267.
- Giovanni Pietro Sacchetti (brother of Angelo, and a Councilor and Grand Chamberlain to the crown) was appointed Governor and administrator of justice in the Province of Apulia on February 26, 1268.
- Pietro Antonio Sacchetti, a Knight of the Golden Spur, served as Podestà (Pretore) of the city and district of L'Aquila under Charles II of Anjou, appointed on April 3, 1287.
- Lazzarino Sacchetti (son of Pietro Antonio) was appointed Treasurer and Cashier of revenues for the province of Abruzzo and manager of the fairs of Lanciano on June 1, 1299.
- Ludovico Sacchetti served as Archbishop of Amalfi, historically recorded conferring ecclesiastical benefits upon Nicola Ruffo of Salerno on January 16, 1324.
- Andrea Guido (Guidotto) Sacchetti (son of Simone) served King Robert of Naples as Captain of Cavalry in Florence with an annual salary of 50 gold ounces. On April 25, 1339, he was also commanded by the King to act as a substitute Captain of War over the city of Manfredonia and the province of Salerno. Through his marriage to Cecilia Brancaccio, he fathered Carlo, Andrea, and Filippo.
- Alfonso Sacchetti was appointed Governor of Calabria Citra by Queen Joanna II of Naples. His son, Giovanni Luigi Sacchetti (Alfonsino), was appointed treasurer and councilor of the province of Calabria for a one-year term with a salary of 200 ducats on July 4, 1453.
- Pietro Antonio Sacchetti was designated Commissioner of Fairs for Cosenza and Calabria by Ferdinand I of Aragon on April 13, 1483.

Later prominent descendants included Alessandro, Marquis of San Quirico, and the ecclesiastic Francesco Antonio Sacchetti (born 1595). Consecrated by Cardinal Giulio Cesare Sacchetti in 1635, Francesco Antonio served as Bishop of San Severo before his appointment as Bishop of Troia in 1648, an office he held until his death in 1662.

=== Roman branch ===
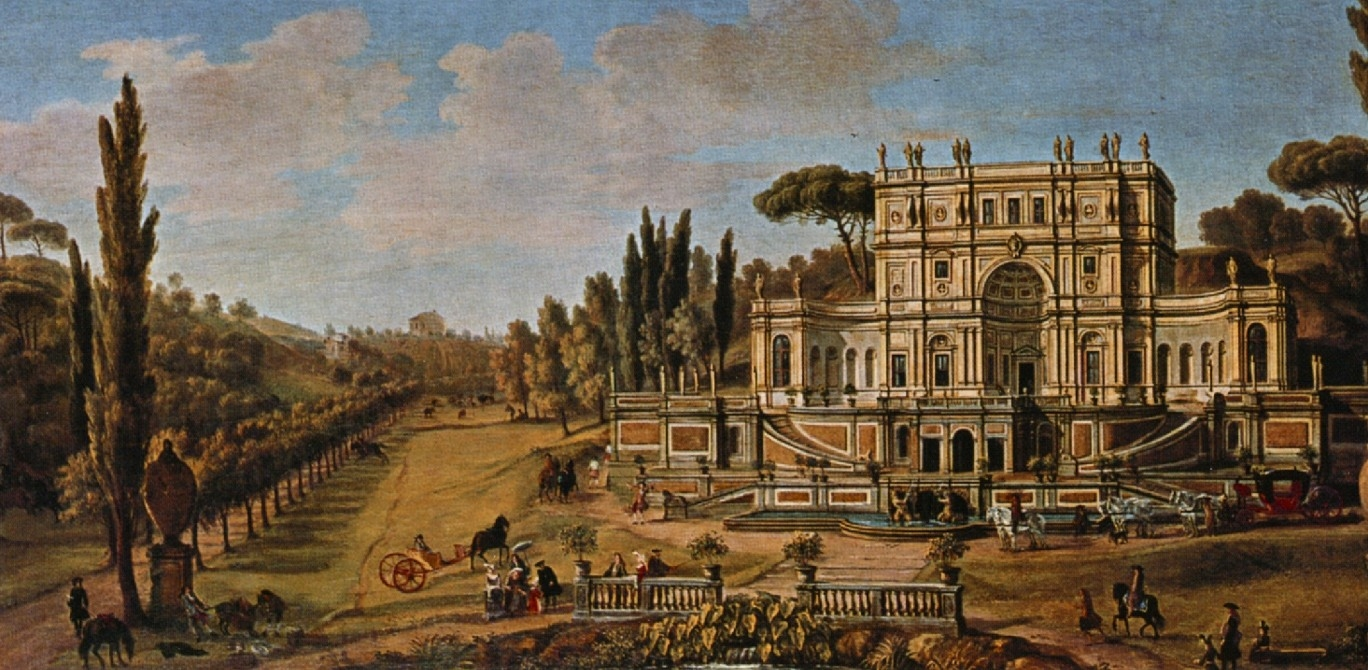
The Villa Pigneto or Sacchetti, or also the Casino al Pigneto del Marchese Sacchetti was a villa in Rome, Italy, designed by the Baroque artist Pietro da Cortona, one of the artist's first works of architecture incorporating ideas found in Giacomo Vignola's Villa Giulia, the Cortile del Belvedere in the Vatican with statuary, in a style reminiscent of Palladio's Palazzo Chiericati (1550) at Vicenza. The villa had its contemporary critics; Bernini likened the structure to a "Christmas crib" (Presepio).

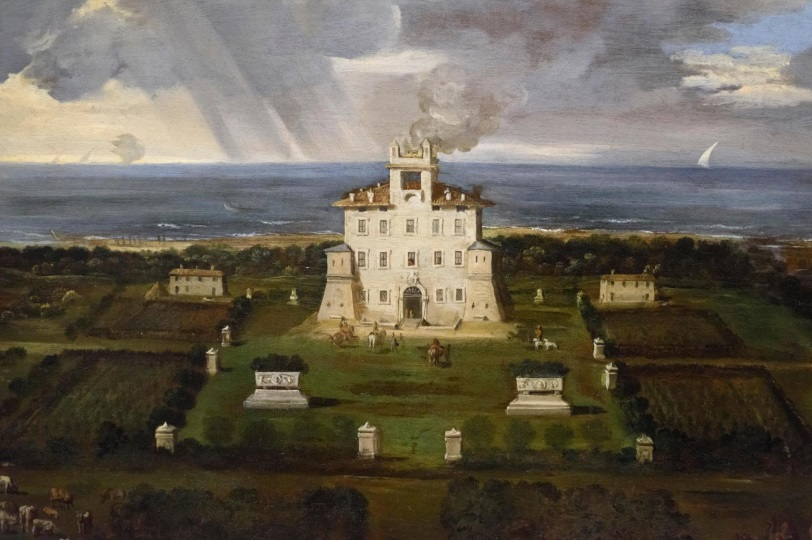
Villa Chigi-Sacchetti at Castel Fusano. Built in 1624-1629 for the Sacchetti family, close associates of Pope Urban VIII, and was the first architectural work of Pietro da Cortona.[1] The villa is now known as Villa Chigi since its acquisition by the Chigi family in the 18th century.

The Roman branch is descended from Giovanni Battista Sacchetti, the son of Matteo Sacchetti and Nanna Carducci. He was a trading partner of the Barberini family of Pope Urban VIII and married Francesca Altoviti, the daughter of Alessandro Altoviti. The marriage had the effect of transferring to the Sacchetti financial resources, property, profitable links with the curia and client relations already established by the Altoviti. They move to Rome from Florence and together they had nine children Matteo (died young), Bindo, Vincenzo, Clarice, Sandrina, Marcello, Alessandro, Ottavia, Matteo, Gianfrancesco and Giulio Cesare. Giulio Cesare became an influential cardinal, and in 1644 and 1655 included in the French Court's list of acceptable candidates for the Papacy.

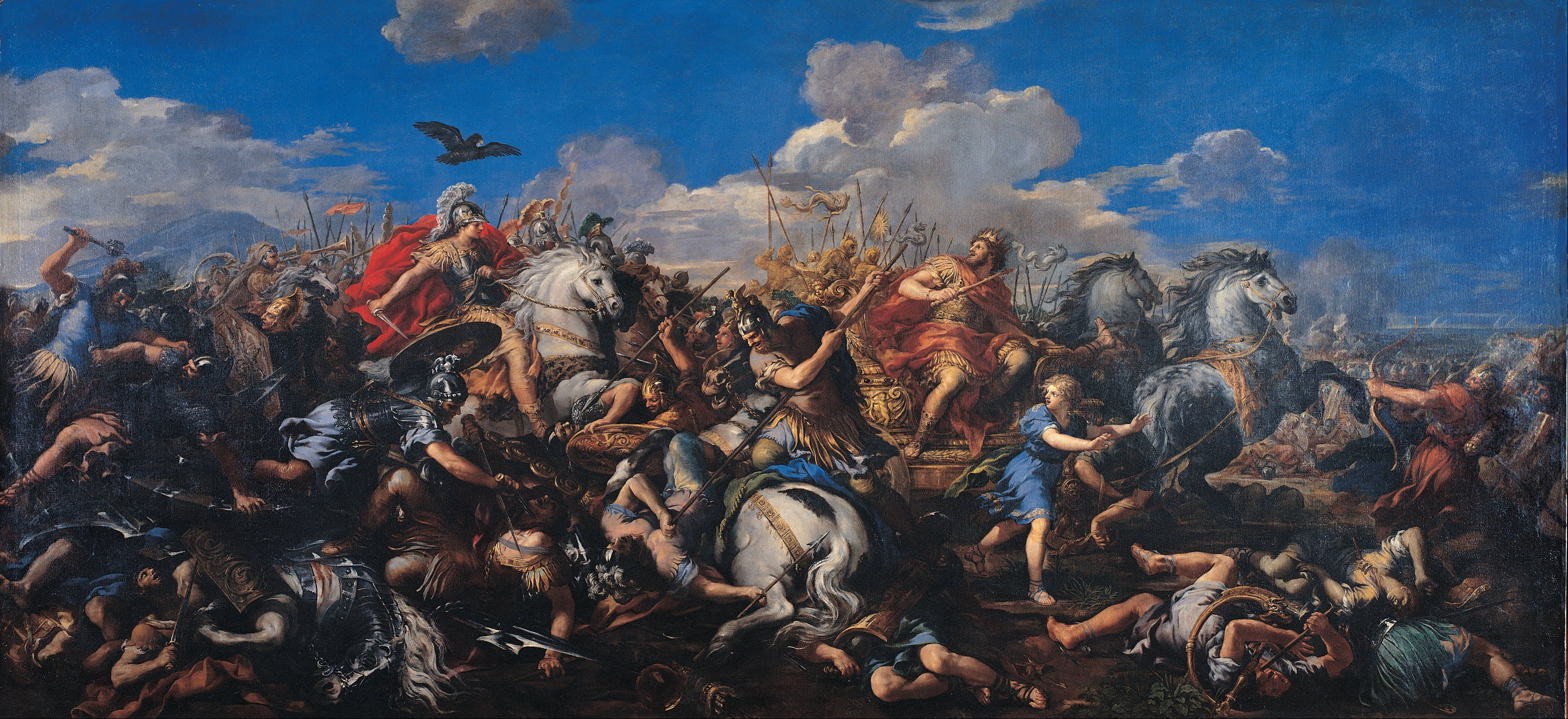
Pietro da Cortona – Battle of Alexander versus Darius. Begun in 1643 Commissioned by Alessandro Sacchetti and alludes to the patron's name and career in the Papal army. Collection: Capitoline Museums

Gianfrancesco was the Commissary General of the Papal troops in Valtellina in 1623 and 1626; and was created Marquis of Rigattini in 1632 and a Marquis of the Baldachin in 1633 giving him the rank of Prince at the papal court. The current Roman branch is descendant from Matteo and his wife Cassandra Ricasoli-Rucellai. Their son Don Giovanni Battista and Caterina Acciaioli inherited his uncle's title and their son Matteo who married Chiara Orsini exchanged the Marquisate of Castel Rigattini for the Marquisate of Castel Romano.

Their son Giulio married Maddalena Azzan. Their son Scipione became the Chief Quartermaster of the Apostolic Palaces in 1794, a title held by the family until the dissolution of the papal court in the 1968. Scipione married Eleonora Cenci Bolognetti daughter of Girolamo Prince of Vicovaro. Their son Urbano married Beatrice Orsini, daughter of Domenico Duke of Gravina and Principe of Solofra and Maria Luisa Torlonia of the Dukes of Poli and Guadagnolo. Their younger son Luigi married Maria Colonna-Barberini, Princess and heiress of Palestrina and with a decree from the Italian state Luigi assumed his wife's titles and assumed the surname Barberini. The eldest son of Urbano and Beatrice Orsini, Giulio married Teresa, the daughter of the Marquis Antonio Gerini and his wife Anna Maria Borghese. Their son Giovanni Battista was a Counselor to the State of the Vatican and married Matilda Lante Montefeltro della Rovere. Their son Giulio, the last Chief Quartermaster of the Vatican, married Giovannella Emo Capodilista, the daughter of the Count Alvise and Maria Henriqueta Alvares Pereira de Mello of the Dukes of Cadaval. Giulio and Giovannella had five children. The current head of the family is their son Urbano.

Sacchetti Patronage in the 17th Century. The family collection contained over 800 paintings and became the foundation for the Capitoline Museum in Rome.
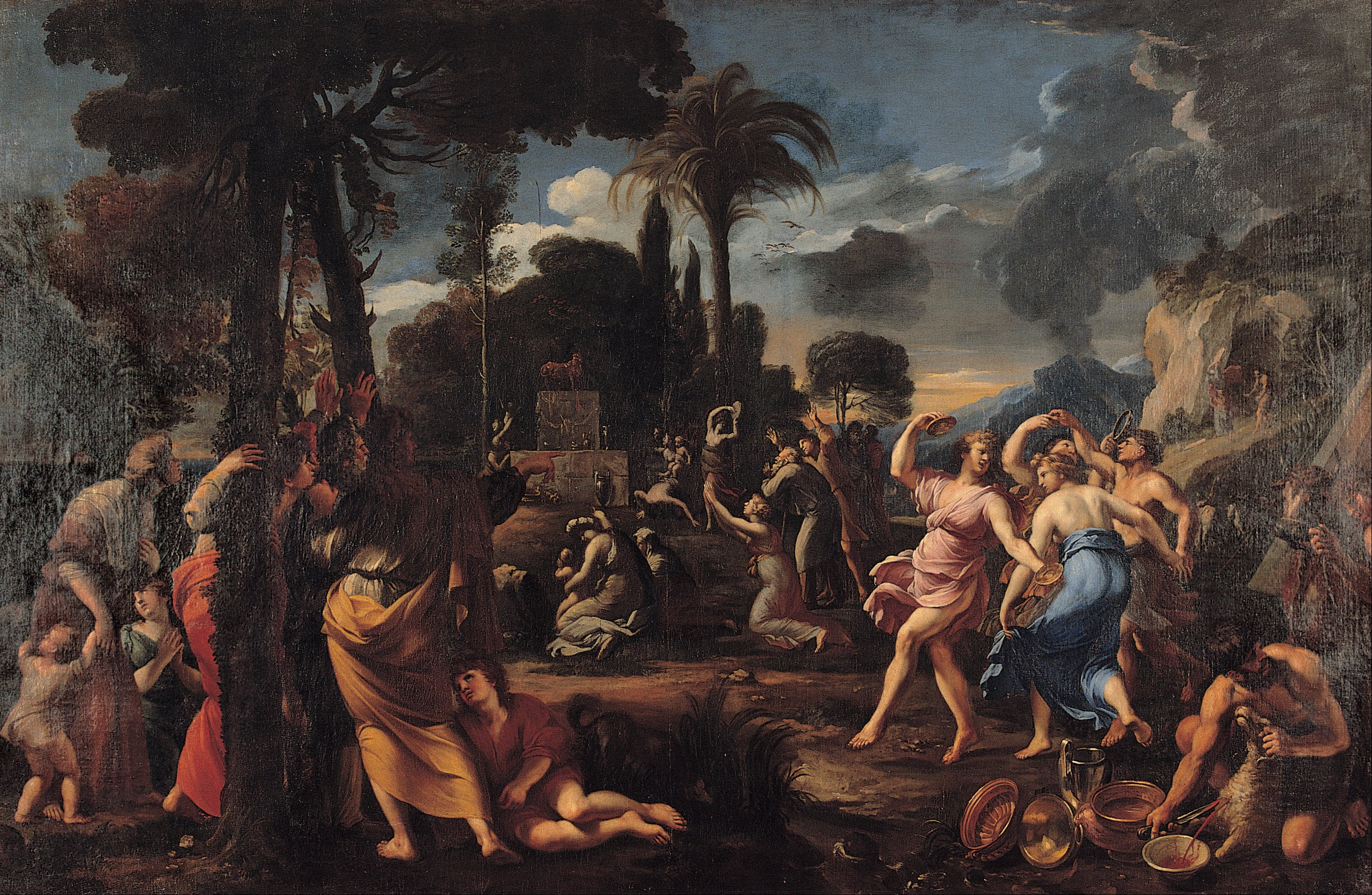
François Perrier Adoration of the Golden Calf.

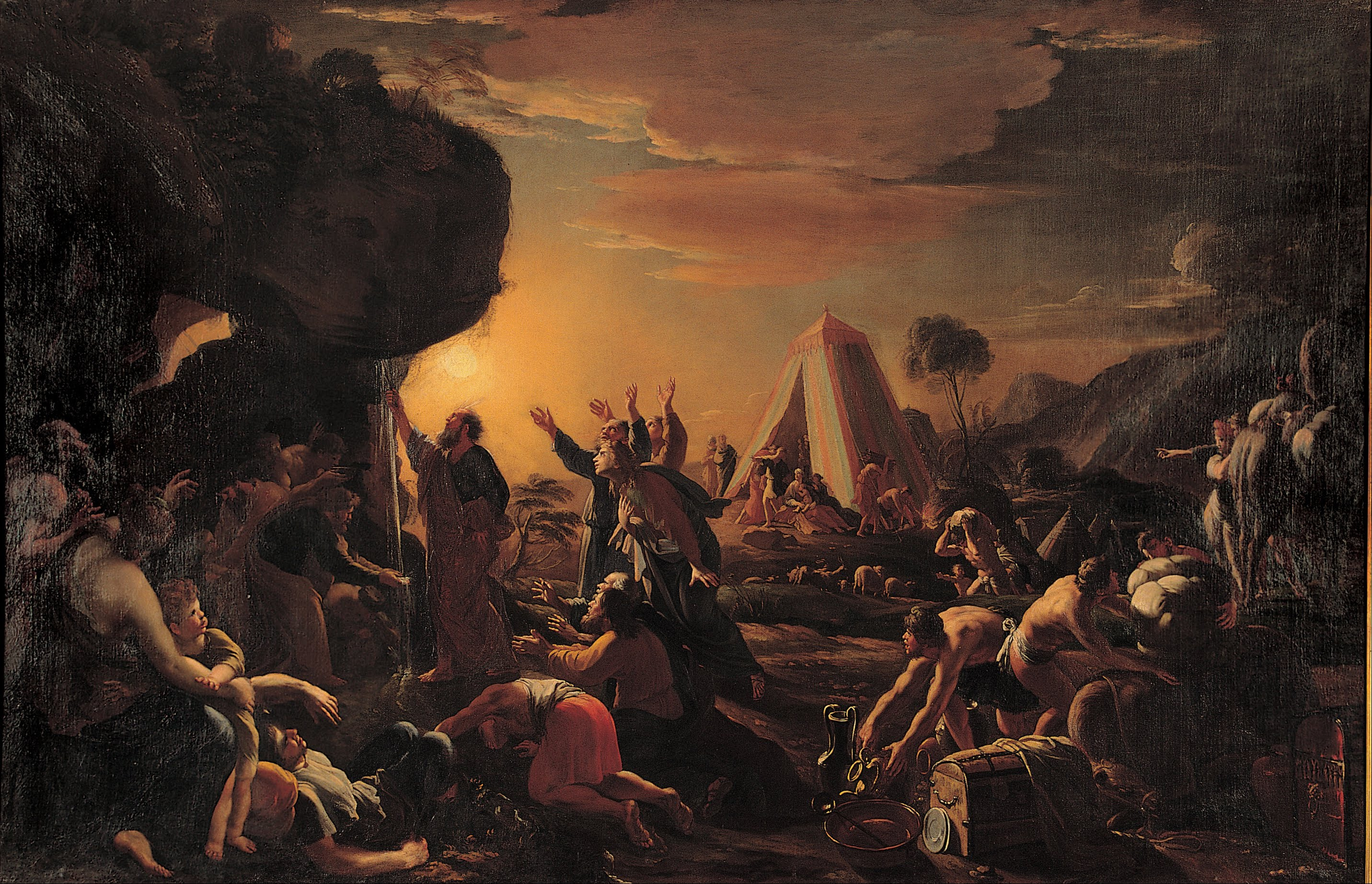
Francois Perrier Moses draws water from the Rock.

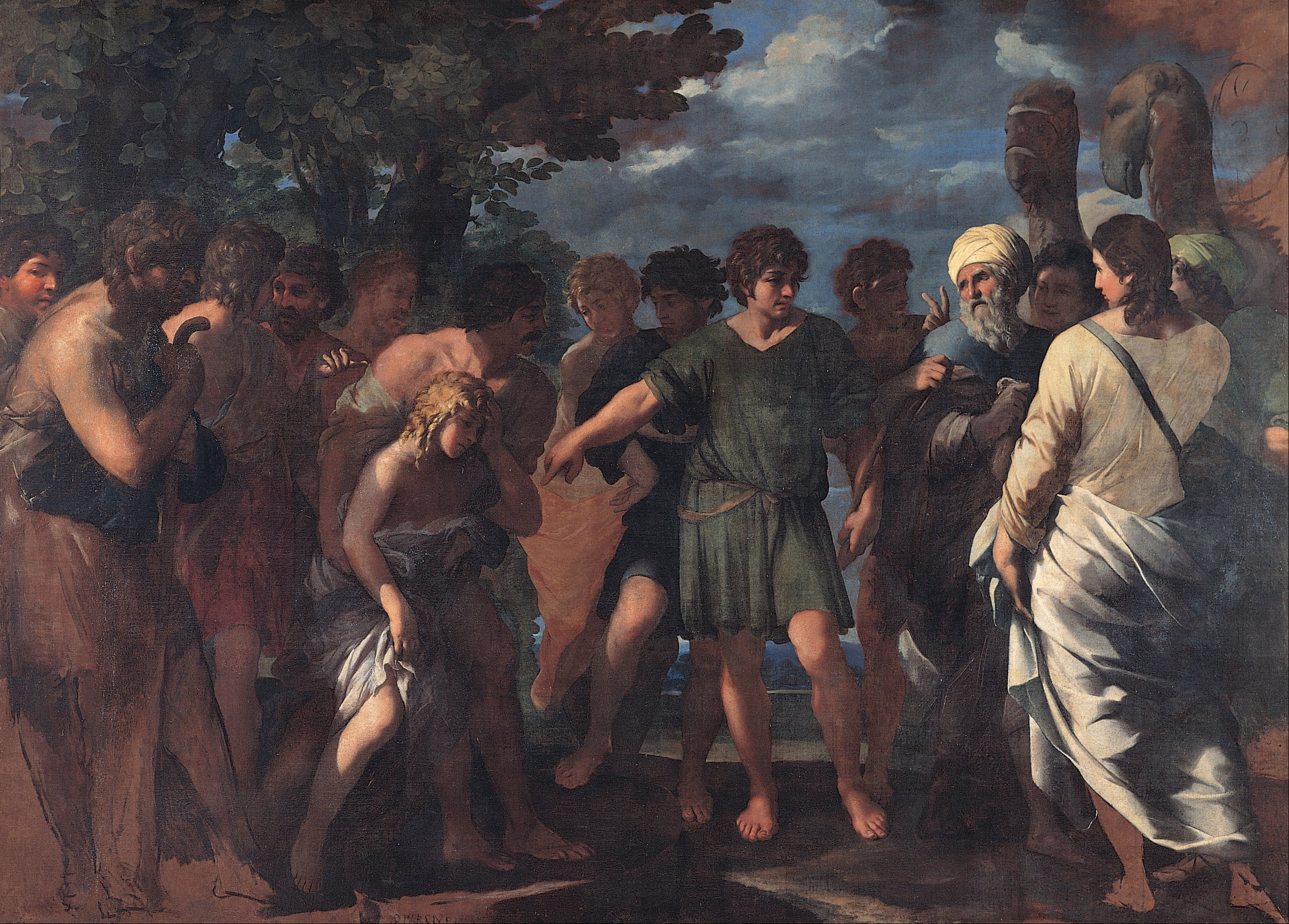
Raffaellino Bottalla. Joseph sold by his Brothers.

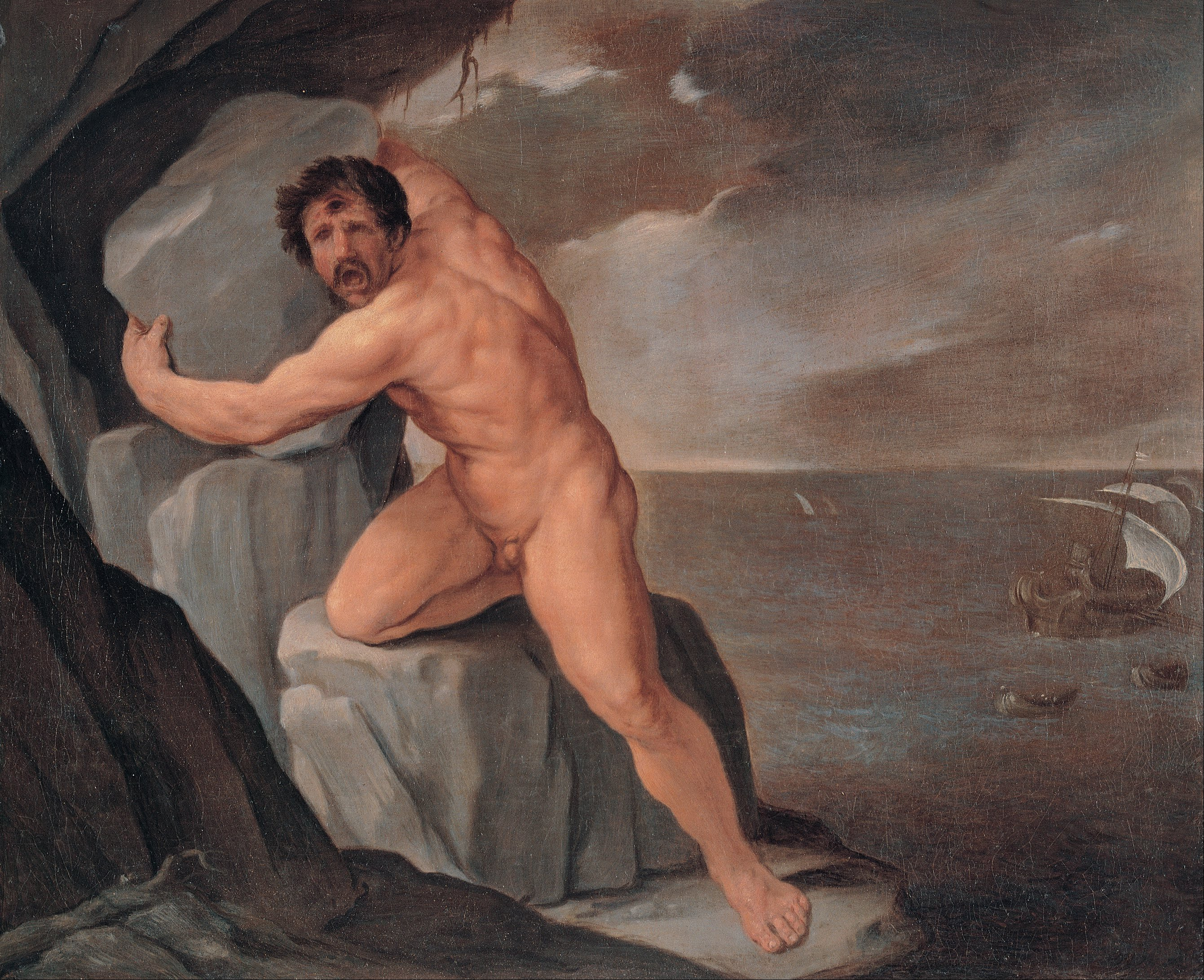
Polyphemus, by Guido Reni.

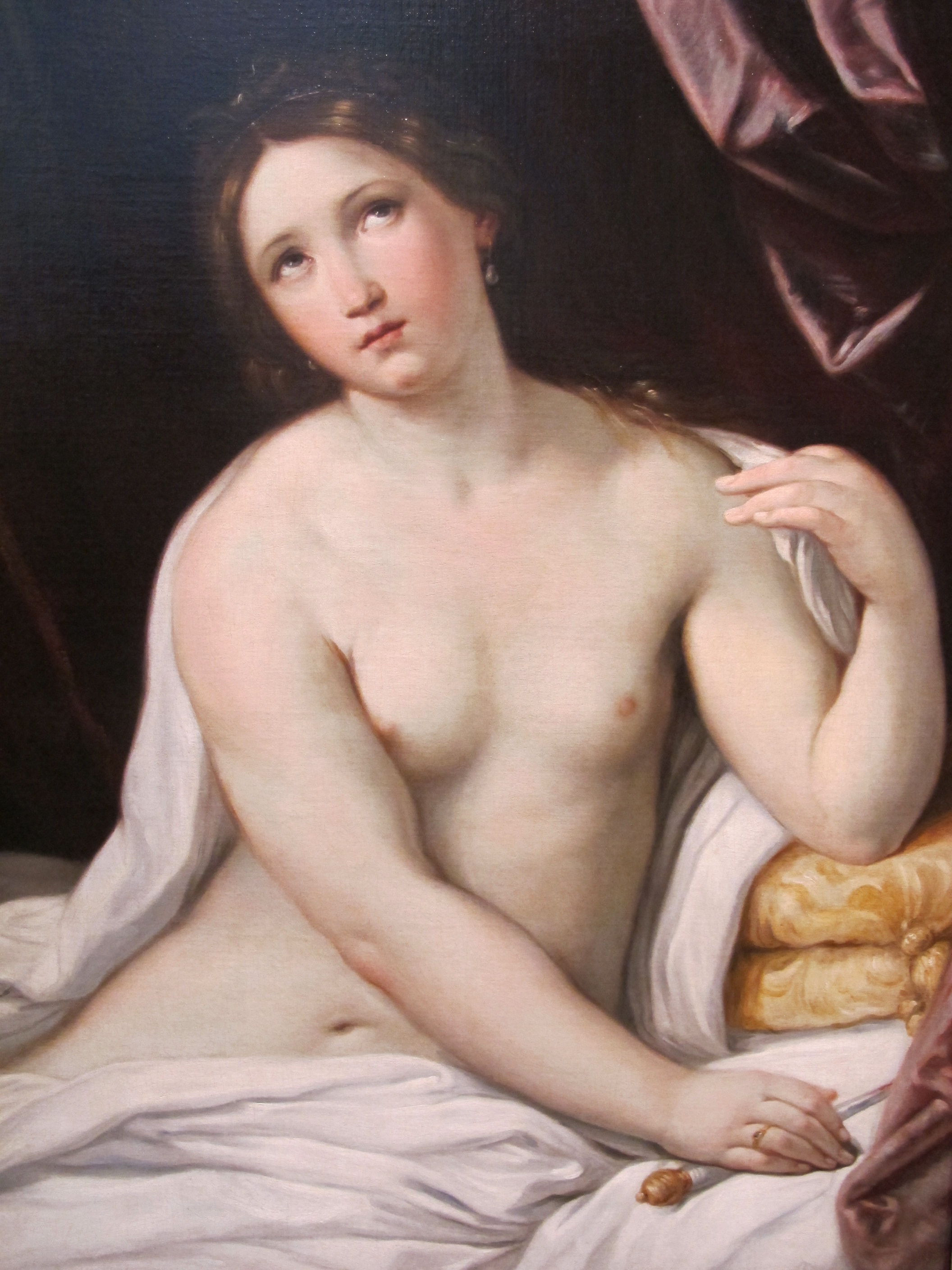
Guido Reni Lucrezia.

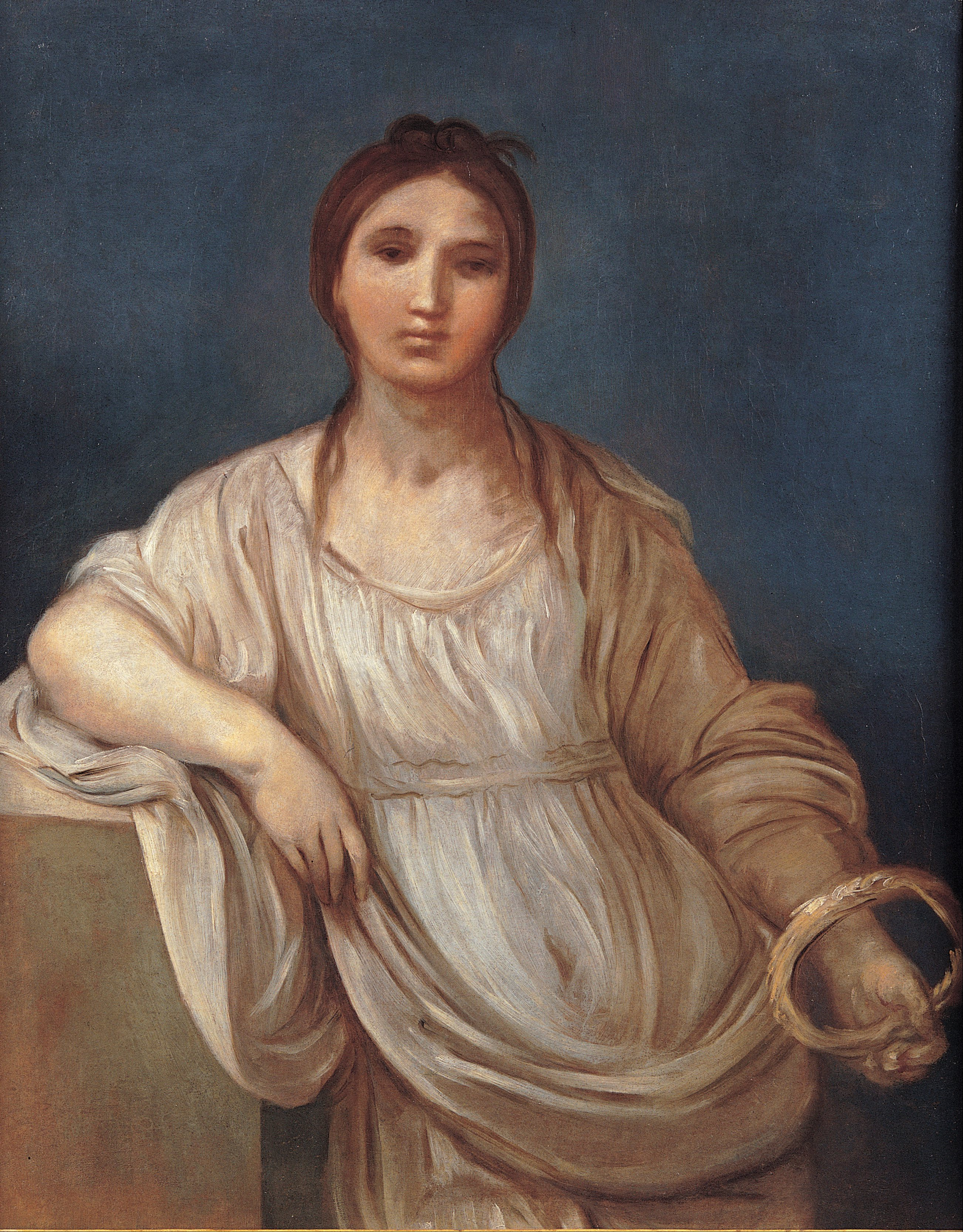
Portrait of girl with a crown by Guido Reni.

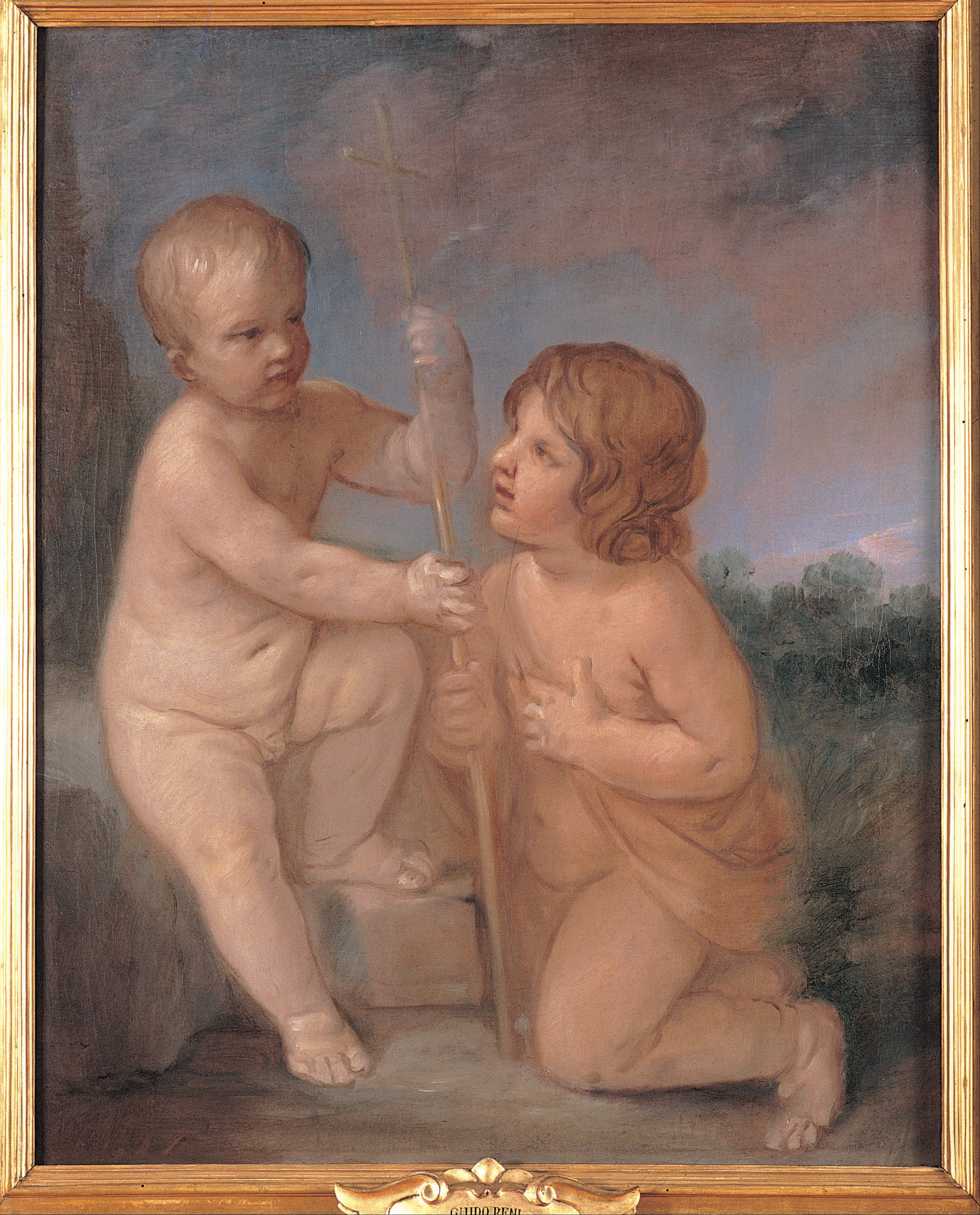
Infant Jesus with St John by Guido Reni.

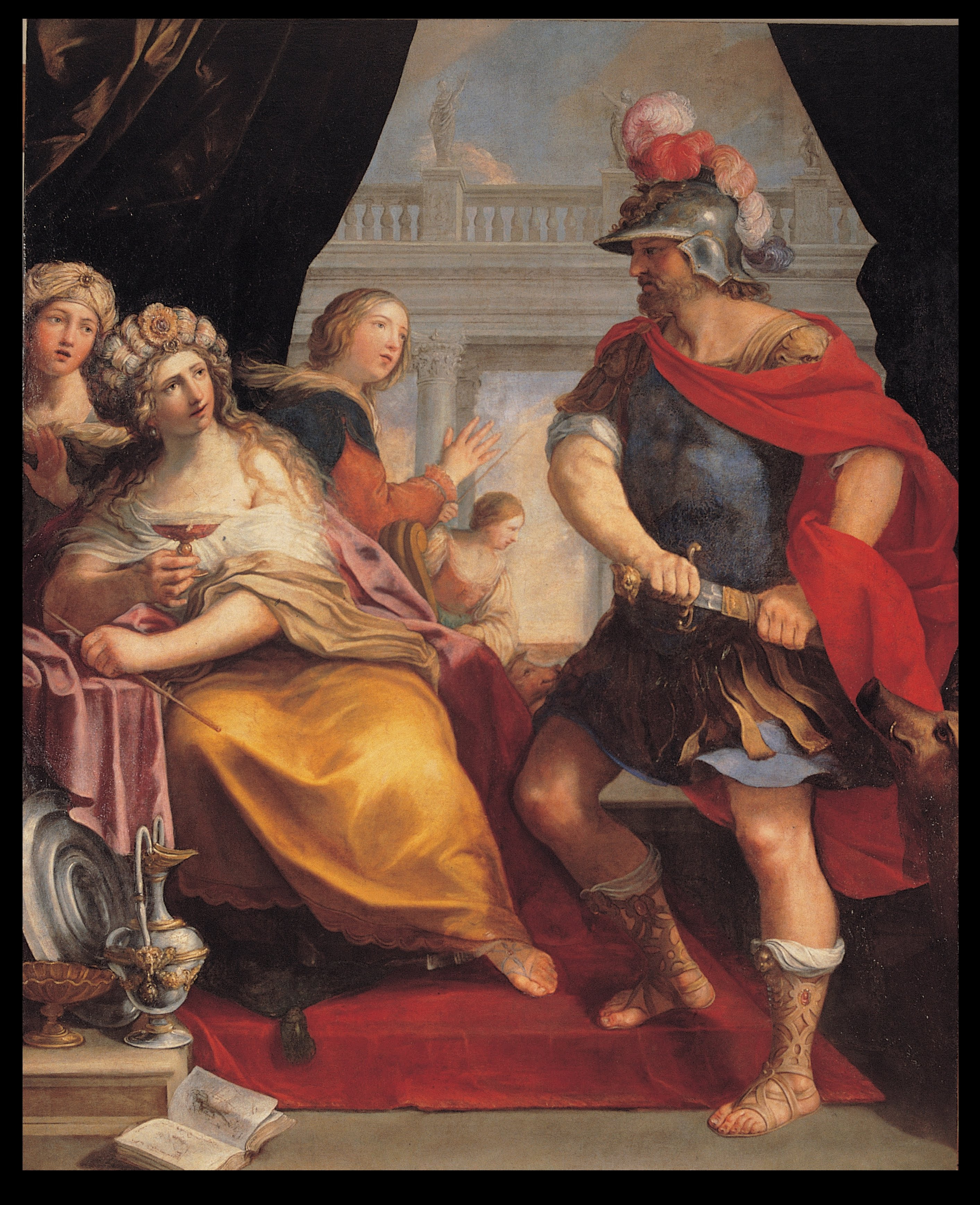
Ulysses and Circe by Giovanni Andrea Sirani.

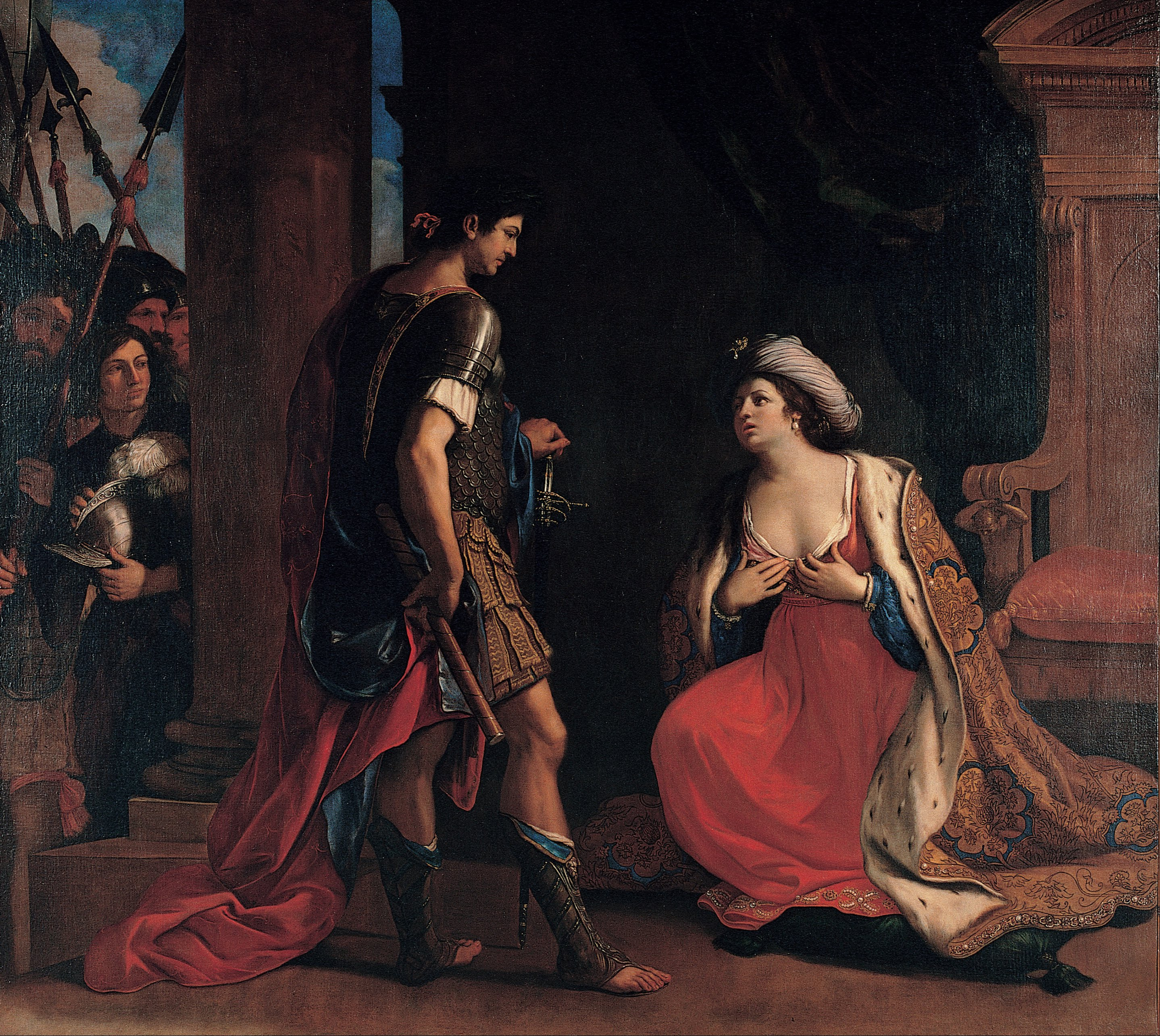
Cleopatra and Octavian, Guercino, Capitoline Museums, Rome.

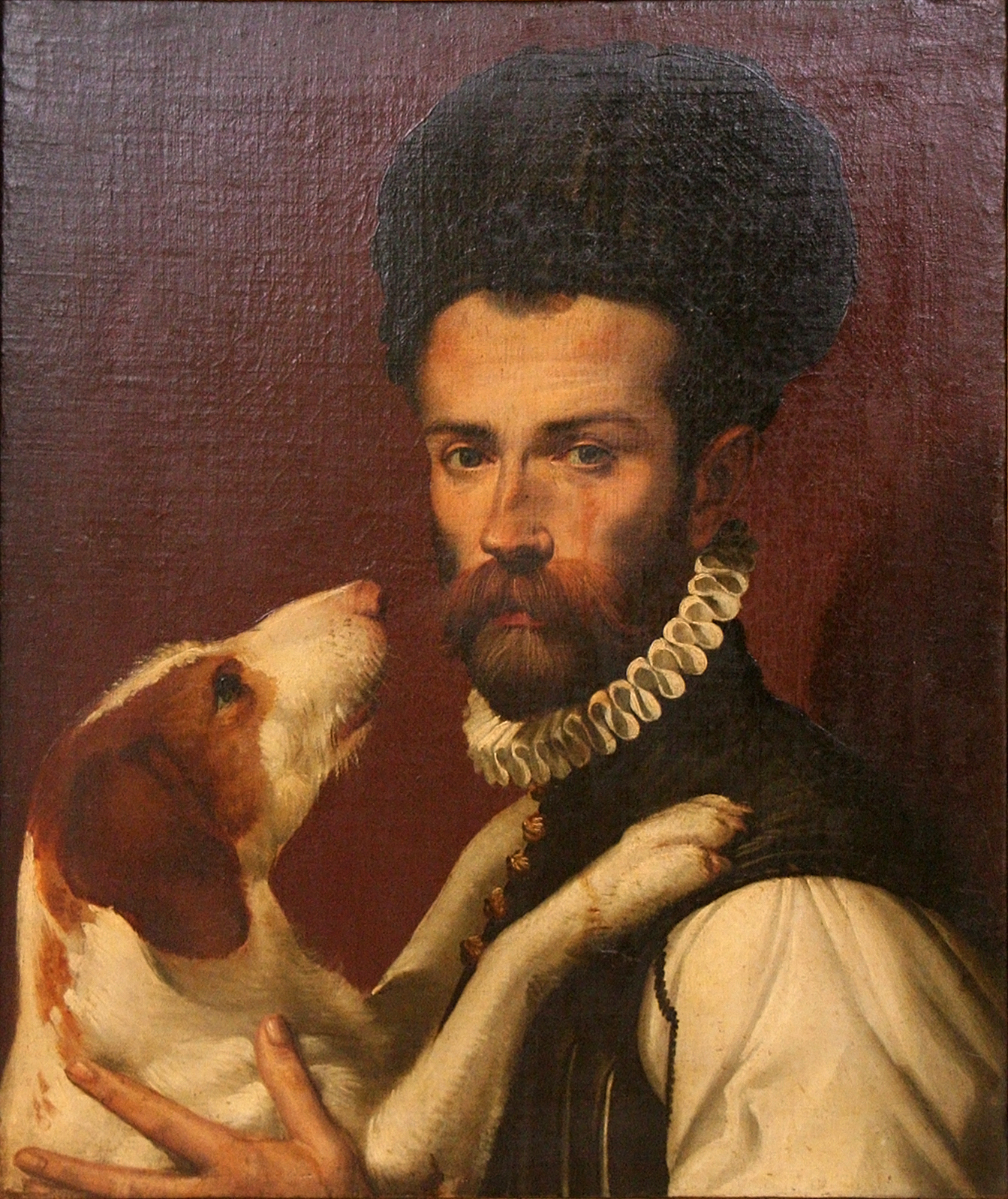
Portrait of a Man with a Dog, Bartolomeo Passerotti

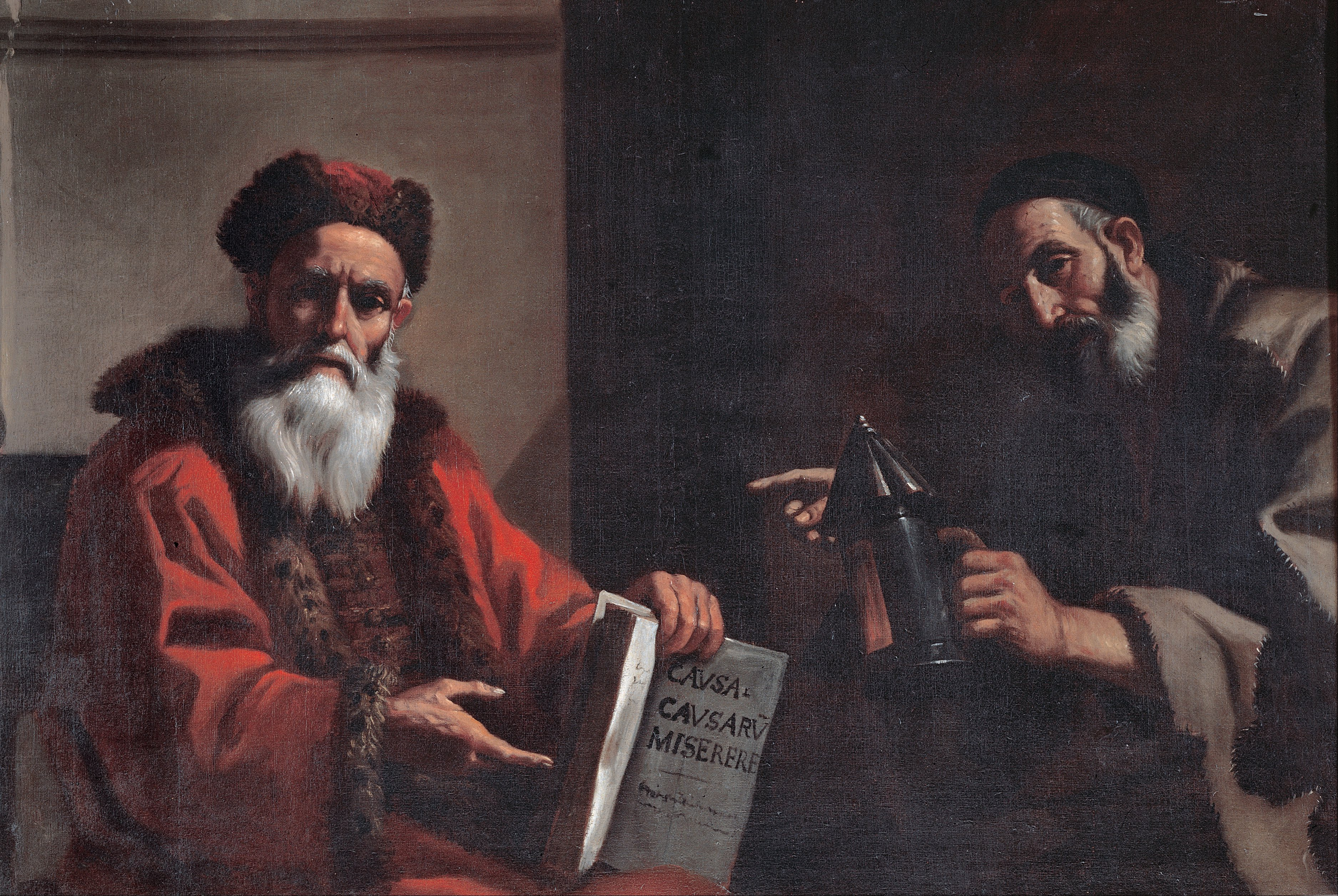
Plato and Diogenes (Mattia Preti), Capitoline Museums, Rome.

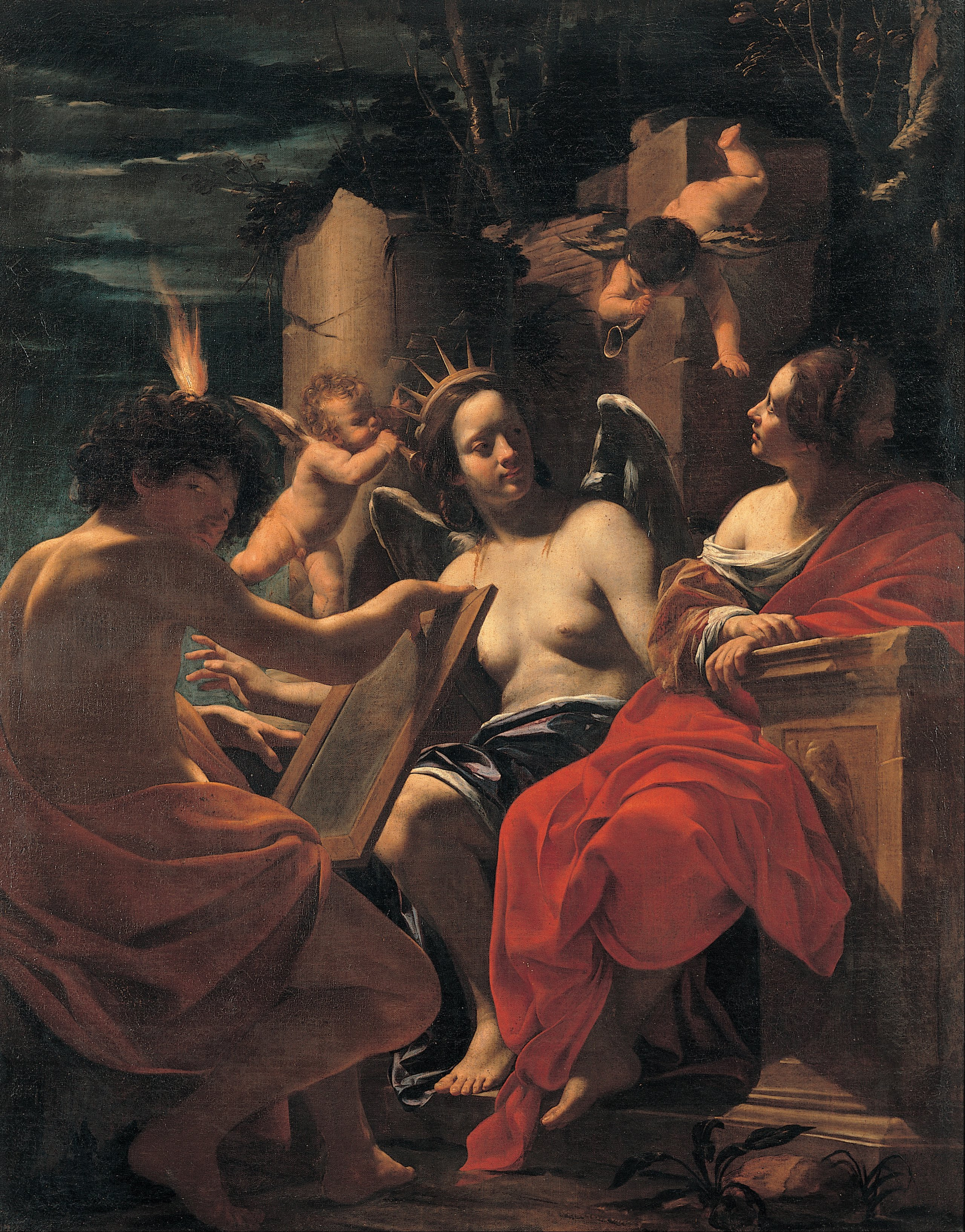
Allegory of Intellect, Will and Memory, Simone Vouet.

== Sacchetti-Barberini-Colonna, Princes of Palestrina ==
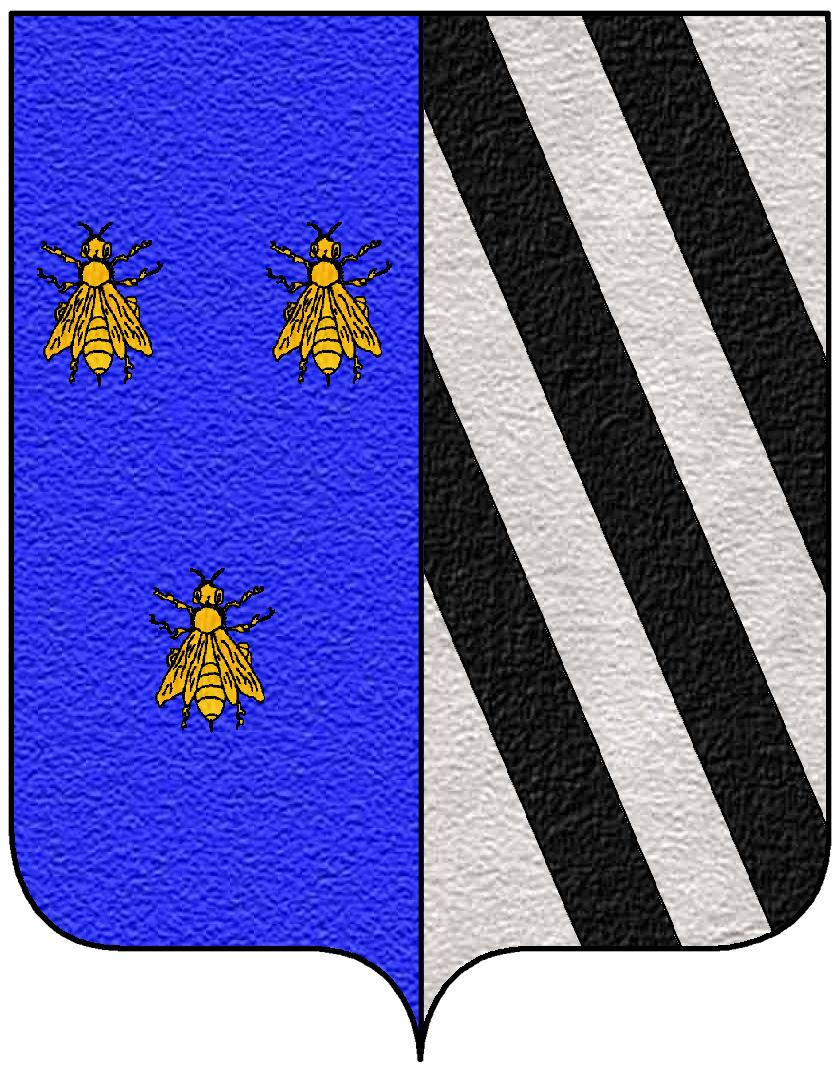
Sacchetti-Barberini

Cornelia Barberini, the daughter of Urbano Barberini and Maria Teresa Boncompagni, was the heiress and last of the Barberini. Cornelia married Giulio Cesare Colonna di Sciarra. This line became known as Barberini-Colonna. The last of this line was Maria, daughter of Prince Enrico Barberini-Colonna and Teresa Orsini. Maria became the heiress of the Barberini-Colonna. Maria married Luigi Sacchetti, son of the Marchese Don Urbano and Donna Beatrice Orsini. Luigi assumed the title of Prince of Palestrina and the name Sacchetti-Barberini, today known as the Barberini, Princes of Palestrina.

== Notable Members ==
Poet Franco Sacchetti (1335–1400), Italian poet and novelist, best known for his Novelle (short stories)

Francesco Sacchetti (died in or before 1473), acclaimed doctor of medicine and professor of logic and law.

Cardinal Giulio Cesare Sacchetti (1586–1663), nominated twice by France for Pope in 1644 and 1655
