= Paolo Massimo Antici =

Italian diplomat

- Born: February 10, 1924; Montegiorgio (Italy)
- Died: August 17, 2003 (aged 79); Rome

Paolo Massimo Antici (February 10, 1924 – August 17, 2003) was an Italian diplomat, founder of the Antici Group, group of officials responsible for preparing the weekly talks between EU Ambassadors.

== Life ==
Paolo Massimo Antici was born in Montegiorgio (Italy) on February 10, 1924. He got a degree in law summa cum laude at Sapienza University of Rome (February 1948). He entered the Italian judiciary through public exam and was appointed judge of first instance at Milan’s court (February 1950). Having passed successfully also the state exam for admission to the diplomatic service, he opted for this career (March 1951).

He was assigned to various diplomatic posts abroad: Budapest (1954–57); Tripoli, Libya (1957–61); Luxembourg (1961–63); The Hague (1966–67). In the years 1964-66 he served at the economics department of the Italian Ministry for Foreign Affairs, in the EEC section. From 1967 to 1970 he worked as International Official in the staff of the EEC Commission in Brussels with the functions of chief assistant to the Commissioner in charge of the external relations Edoardo Martino.

Back to the national diplomatic services, he was assigned to the Permanent Representation of Italy to the EEC in Brussels, at first as First Counselor and afterwards with the rank of deputy head of the Representation (1970–1978); in this period he created the so-called “Antici Group”, an informal – yet well known in the European circles – working group composed of high officials of all the permanent representations of the member states and having the task of preparing the work of the ambassadors at the Council of the European Union. From 1978 to 1983 he was Deputy Director General for the International Cultural Relations at the Italian Ministry for foreign affairs. From 1983 to 1989 he was Ambassador and Permanent Representative of Italy to the Council of Europe in Strasburg.

He died in Rome on August 17, 2003. He was married with two children, Claudia and Patrizio Antici.
