= Massimo Guiggiani =

Italian engineering professor (born 1956)

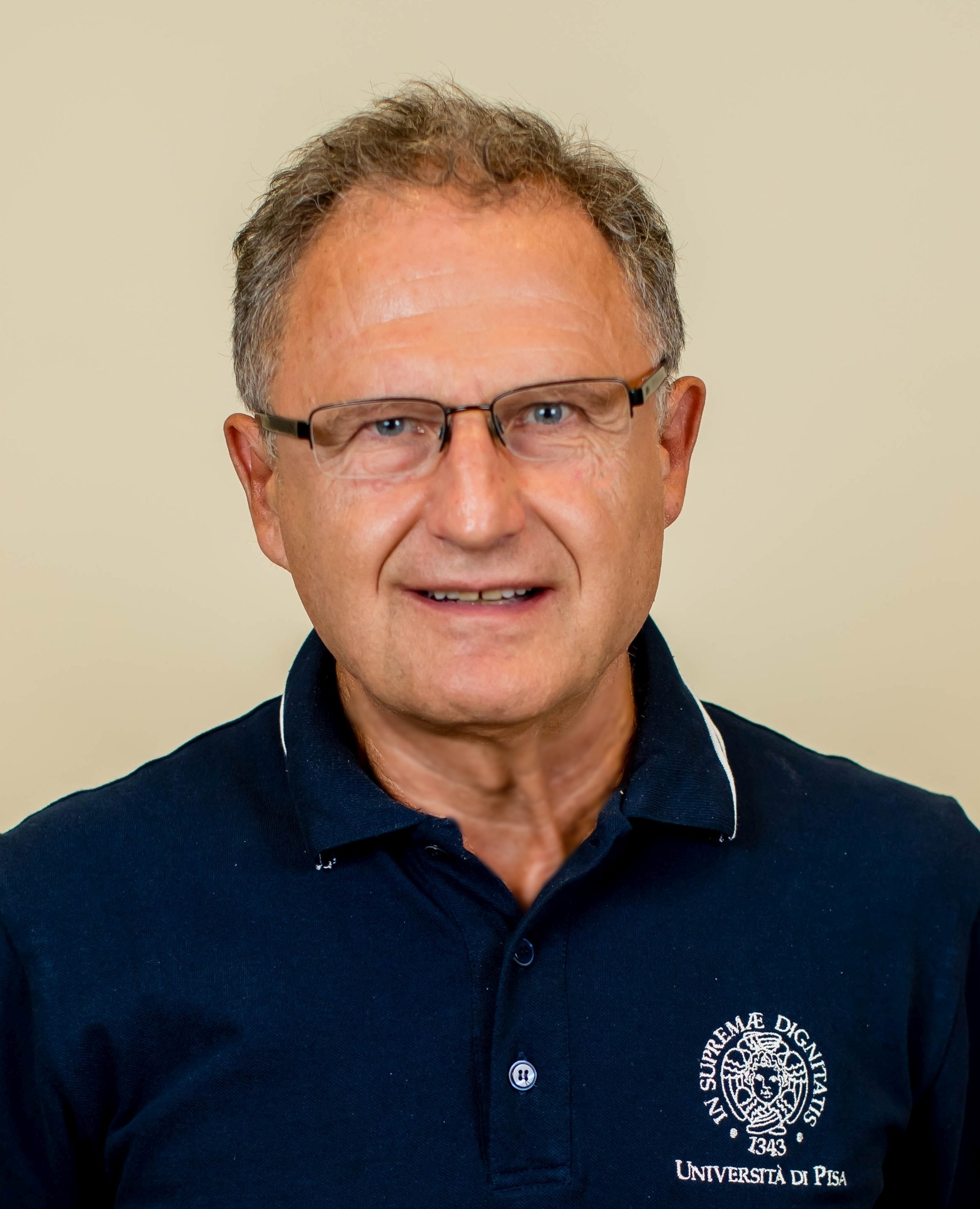
- Born: August 16, 1956 (age 70); Siena
- Citizenship: Italian
- Occupation: professor of applied mechanics
- Known for: Guiggiani's algorithm in the BEM, invariant approach for gears, The Science of Vehicle Dynamics
- Awards: 2019 TAA Textbook Excellence Award, Soichiro Honda Medal

Academic work
- Discipline: Boundary element method, theory of gear generation, vehicle dynamics

Massimo Guiggiani (born in Siena, 16 August 1956) is an Italian mechanical engineer and academic with interests in vehicle dynamics, gear drives and the boundary element method (BEM). He is professor of applied mechanics at the Università di Pisa. He created an algorithm, Guiggiani's method, for the evaluation of strongly singular and hypersingular integrals. He is the author of The Science of Vehicle Dynamics.

In 2019 he received a Textbook Excellence Award from TAA and the “Ordine del Cherubino” from University of Pisa.

For several years, he was the faculty advisor of the E-Team Squadra Corse, the racing team of the Università di Pisa that every year designs and builds a single-seater racing car to participate in Formula SAE and Formula Student competitions.

== Guiggiani's Algorithm ==
One of the main issues in the Boundary Element Method (BEM) is the evaluation of strongly singular and hypersingular surface integrals. It was commonly believed that they could not be evaluated directly. In a few papers published in 1987–1992, Guiggiani was able to show that they were computable in a direct and effective way. This direct algorithm has now become classical (Guiggiani's method). It has been applied in several fields like fracture mechanics, earthquake engineering, biology, particle physics, elasticity, plasticity, fluid mechanics, etc. and in commercial codes. Two MSc students, Paolo Casalini and Antonio Gigante, helped in the development of the algorithm for Cauchy principal value integrals. The non-trivial extension to hypersingular integrals was carried out while visiting Iowa State University in 1989-1990 and published in 1992. While Guiggiani was Maître de Recherche at Ecole Polytechnique, the direct approach was extended with Marc Bonnet to singular integrals in the Galerkin BEM. The extension to higher-order singularities was done with Attilio Frangi.

== Gear Generation and Optimization ==
Since the year 2000, Guiggiani has led the Gear Group of the University of Pisa, contributing directly to the formulation of the Invariant Approach of the theory of gear generation. The research on gears, carried out mostly by Marco Gabiccini and Alessio Artoni, has led to the development of algorithms for the optimization of the micro-geometry and the identification of cutting parameters much better than those previously available. Software codes based on these algorithms were implemented under contracts from Avio Aero and the GearLab of Ohio State University.

== (The Science of) Vehicle Dynamics ==
Since 1993 Guiggiani has been involved in Vehicle Dynamics, with the publication of books, including The Science of Vehicle Dynamics (2014, 2018 2nd ed., and 2023 3rd ed.). Thanks to the contents of this work, he was invited to give long series of lessons at, among others, Ferrari F1 in Italy and Apple in the USA. In several parts, the book departs from commonly accepted explanations.

== Awards ==
In 2019, The Science of Vehicle Dynamics received the Textbook Excellence Award for bringing "practical and innovative" material with industry impact..

In 2026, Massimo Guiggiani was awarded the Soichiro Honda Medal, ASME's highest distinction for research in automotive engineering and transportation, with the following motivation: "For introducing a methodological approach to the study of vehicle dynamics, unveiling important theoretical aspects and putting an end to common misconceptions, ultimately transforming the discipline into a rigorous, predictive engineering science, reshaping industry practices".
