= Massimo Podestà =

Italian artist and architect (born 1949)

- Born: 22 September 1949 (age 76); Sarzana, Italy
- Known for: Painting, Designer
- Website: www.massimopodesta.it/

Massimo Podestà is an Italian artist and architect born in Sarzana, Italy, living and working in Florence, Italy.

== Biography ==
In 1976 he graduated in architecture at the University of Florence with professor Leonardo Savioli. From 1979 he began the activity of designer designing furniture, lamps and bags.in this period he collaborates with the artistic direction of several companies for the production of his creations and participating in Italian and international exhibitions such as Firenze al Gift, Milan at Macef, Verona Abitare il tempo, Milan Salone del Mobile, Colonia Mobile, Frankfurt Gift, Paris Mobile. In 1985 he signed the manifesto of the "New Renaissance".

== Painting ==
- 1971 Solo exhibition galleria La Lambertesca, Firenze.
- 1971 Solo exhibition galleria Quattordici, Firenze.
- 1972 Solo exhibition Simon's Gallery, Vicenza.
- 1973 Solo exhibition galleria Zamboni, Firenze.
- 1975 Solo exhibition galleria Il Raffaello, Firenze.
- 1987 Solo exhibition Studio Gianni, Firenze.
- 2001 Solo exhibition Limonaia di Palazzo Strozzi, Firenze.
- 1982 Exhibition Gruppo Donatello, Firenze.
- 1987 Exhibition Expoarte, Bari.
- 2005 Exhibition Conservatoire de Musique, Reims.
- 2004 Exhibition Galleria Art in Florence, Firenze
- 2003 Exhibition Palazzo Appiani, Piombino
- 2003 Exhibition Bar Alessandro Nannini, Firenze.
- 2002 Exhibition Stazione Leopolda (Fabbrica Europa) 2002 Firenze
- 2002 Exhibition Roberto Greco at La Pergola Arte of Florence
- 2005 Exhibition “Giorno della memoria”, Consiglio regionale della Toscana.
- 2008 Solo Exhibition Podestà Massimo al Borghese Palace Art Hotel di Firenze.

- 2017 Exhibition Bianco e Nero the artists dello Studio Giambo di Firenze.
- 2017 Exhibition Bargellini, Paoli e Podestà in mostra allo studio Giambo Firenze.
