= Maximo =

Maximo or Máximo may refer to:

== Arts ==
- Capcom video game series
  - Maximo: Ghosts to Glory (also known as just Maximo)
  - Maximo vs. Army of Zin, the sequel to Ghosts to Glory
- Maxïmo Park, a British indie rock band
- Maximu or Maximo, a legendary female warrior descended from the Amazons who is killed by Basil Digenes Akritas

== People ==
- Joel and Jose Maximo, a wrestling tag team known as The S.A.T.
- Máximo (wrestler) (born 1980), ring name of Mexican wrestler José Christian Nieves Ruiz
- Maximo Adams (born 2008), American basketball player
- Maximo Blanco (born 1983), Venezuelan professional Mixed Martial Artist
- Máximo Gómez (1836–1905), military commander of the Cuba independence campaign
- Máximo Macapobre, Filipino activist and the founder of Toledo City, Philippines
- Máximo Rigondeaux (born 1976), Cuban javelin thrower
- Máximo Santos (1847–1889), Uruguay president
- Máximo Tajes (1852–1912), Uruguay president
- Maximo V. Lorenzo (born 1982), comic artist.
- Maximo V. Soliven, Filipino journalist
- Maximo Yabes (1932–1967), born in Lodi, California, was a United States Army soldier

== Other ==
- Maximo, Ohio
- Maximo (software)
- Máximo (restaurant), in Mexico City
