= Franco Sacchetti =

Italian poet and novelist

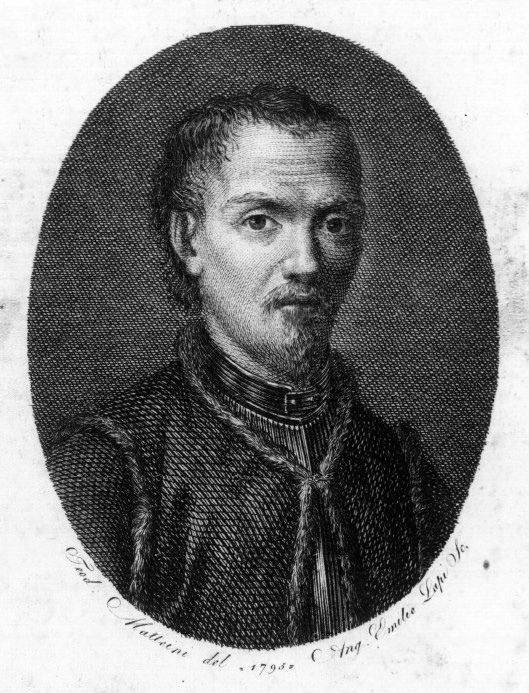
- Franco Sacchetti
- Born: 1332; Ragusa, Republic of Ragusa
- Died: August 1400 (aged 67–68); San Miniato, Republic of Florence
- Occupations: Writer; Merchant; Politician; Diplomat
- Spouses: Maria Felice Strozzi (m. 1354; died 1377) Ghita di Piero Gherardini (m. 1383; died 1396) Giovanna di Francesco Bruni (after 1396)
- Parent(s): Benci del Buono Sacchetti and Maria Sacchetti
- Writing career
- Language: Italian (Tuscan and Florentine dialect); Medieval Latin
- Genres: novella; lyric poem; correspondence; essay
- Notable works: La battaglia delle belle donne; Sposizioni dei Vangeli; Il Trecentonovelle
- Literary movement: Renaissance humanism

Franco Sacchetti (Italian pronunciation: [ˈfraŋko sakˈketti]; 1332 – August 1400), was an Italian poet and novelist.

== Biography ==
Born in Florence or in Ragusa (modern Dubrovnik), he was the son of Benci di Uguccione, surnamed "Buono", a Florentine merchant of the noble and ancient family of the Sacchetti. He was married three times; first to Maria Felice Strozzi with whom he had two sons, Filippo and Niccolò. Franco’s second wife was Ghita di Piero Gherardini, his third wife was Giovanna di Francesco Bruni. He was the brother of Giannozzo Sacchetti, a follower of Catherine of Siena, who was executed following the Ciompi Revolt. While still a young man he achieved repute as a poet, and he appears to have traveled on affairs of more or less importance as far as to Genoa, Milan and Slavonia.

After 1363 he settled in Florence. When a sentence of banishment was passed upon the rest of the house of Sacchetti by the Florentine authorities in 1380 (after the Ciompi revolt) it appears that Sacchetti was expressly exempted, per esser tanto uomo buono ("because he is a very good man"), and in 1383 he was one of the eight, discharging the office of prior for the months of March and April.

A merchant, after 1363 Sacchetti turned to politics, undertaking numerous diplomatic missions on behalf of the Florentine state. In 1386 he was chosen ambassador to Genoa, but preferred to go as podestà to Bibbiena in Casentino. In 1392 he was podestà of San Miniato, and in 1396 he held a similar office at Faenza. In 1398 he received from his fellow-citizens the post of captain of their then province of Romagna, having his residence at Portico. He died at San Miniato, probably of the plague, in August 1400.

Sacchetti wrote sonnets, canzoni, madrigals, and other poems; his best known works are however his Novelle (short stories). They were originally 300 in number, but today only 223 survive, some of them incomplete, the rest having been lost. Sacchetti's Trecentonovelle show him as the best Italian short-story writer between Boccaccio and Bandello. They were not fitted into any framework like that of Boccaccio's Decameron. The best of them are of a humorous character; and their style is more simple and colloquial than Boccaccio's. Sacchetti does not aim at tragedy or complication of plot or subtle delineation of character, but simply at bringing the comic or curious event briskly to life, drawing largely on the oral tradition and on direct observation for his material.

He has been defined as an author of Proto-Morlachism, a purported early stage of Morlachism.

== Works ==
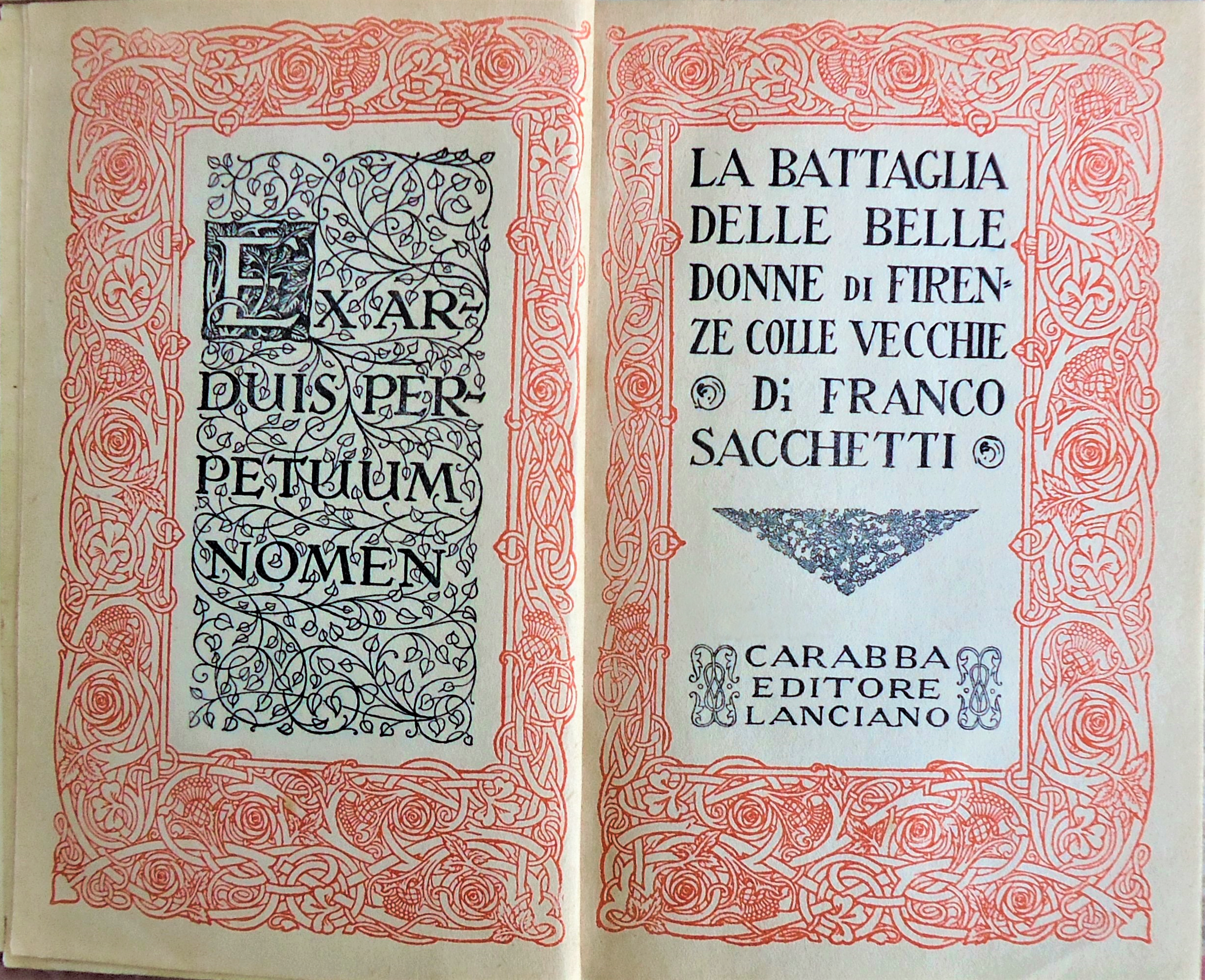
Franco Sacchetti, La battaglia delle belle donne di Firenze colle vecchie, ed. Carabba, 1917.

Sacchetti was a prolific writer. His literary career proceeds in tandem with his busy public life and is partly a commentary on it. His first work is an encomiastic poem in ottava rima, La battaglia delle belle donne di Firenze con le vecchie (1354). This mixes popular and literary features; its metre is that of the marketplace improvisers, but the models are Boccaccio's early Caccia di Diana, which paid homage to the belles of the Neapolitan court, and Dante's (lost) sirventes on the sixty most beautiful ladies in Florence mentioned in the Vita Nova (6). Sacchetti began collecting his lyric poems around the same time, eventually producing a Libro delle rime, which contains more than 300 poems covering a variety of topics and written in a variety of metres. It is a kind of poetic diary, in which Sacchetti notes, usually in chronological order, reflections and musings linked to his daily life. The earlier poems are on love or political themes or are comic in character, whilst those of his mature years are more moralistic and religious.

Sacchetti is best known as a writer of novelle. His narrative abilities are already evident in the Sposizioni di Vangeli (c. 1381), a lay equivalent of the kind of sermon-writing practised by contemporary preachers. It is modelled on sermons for Lent. Its forty-nine chapters are each divided into three parts: the quaestio, proposing the theme to be treated, the exemplum developing the narrative proper, and the absolutio which states the moral to be drawn.

The Trecentonovelle, Sacchetti's masterpiece of novella writing, has something of the same stamp. It was planned as early as 1385, but the stories were written and gathered together between 1392 and 1397. The title presupposes the inevitable comparison with the 100 stories of the Decameron, with which it does not aim to compete stylistically, but which it assumes can be supplemented and updated in terms of narrative material. The Proemio announces that the collection includes not just traditional novelle, but accounts of events which the author witnessed or which happened to him personally. Although there is no frame, the presence of the author as narrator, or on occasion as a character, gives the work its narrative unity. The action of memory links the stories together and a sturdy moral approach extracts practical lessons from them. The result is a full, lively depiction of Florence as it was at the end of the 14th century The Trecentonovelle has survived only in a 16th-century transcription, containing 223 out of the original 300 novelle.

== See also ==
- Florence
- Early Italian Renaissance
- Renaissance humanism
- Republic of Florence
- Republic of Ragusa

== Sources ==
- Sapegno, Natalino (1936). "SACCHETTI, Franco". Enciclopedia Italiana. Rome: Istituto dell'Enciclopedia Italiana.
- Zaccarello, Michelangelo (2017). "SACCHETTI, Franco". Dizionario Biografico degli Italiani (in Italian). Vol. 89: Rovereto–Salvemini. Rome: Istituto dell'Enciclopedia Italiana. ISBN 978-88-12-00032-6.
- Werner, Alice (1893). The Humour of Italy. London: W. Scott Ltd.
- Picone, Michelangelo (2002). "Sacchetti, Franco". The Oxford Companion to Italian Literature. Oxford University Press. ISBN 978-0-19-818332-7.
