= Massimo Maugeri =

Italian writer, journalist and radio presenter

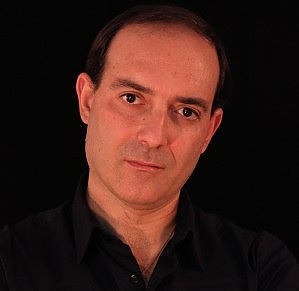
Massimo Maugeri, 2013

Massimo Maugeri (born May 18, 1968, in Catania, Sicily, Italy) is an Italian writer, blogger and radio presenter.

== Career ==
Massimo Maugeri is the founder and director of Letteratitudine, a very popular and influential literary blog launched in 2006. Renowned for its commentary on contemporary Italian literature, it serves as a platform for discussions on literature, culture, and the arts. Maugeri is also the host of a radio program that focuses on books and cultural themes. He has written several novels and essays, which have garnered critical acclaim and numerous literary awards. His works include Identità distorte, Cetti Curfino, Trinacria Park and Il sangue della Montagna. Many of his writings explore themes of identity, societal distortion, and the cultural landscape of Sicily. His most recent novel, Quel che facciamo dell'amore, nominated for the 2026 Strega Prize by Giorgio Nisini, examines the relationship between love and responsibility while addressing questions of civil rights and exploring the history of the Beatles. In addition to his literary endeavors, Maugeri has contributed extensively to cultural sections of newspapers and magazines, solidifying his reputation as a key figure in contemporary Italian literature. He has also participated in various literary festivals and events, both in Italy and internationally. Maugeri has received accolades such as the Martoglio Prize and the Vittorini Prize, recognizing his contributions to Italian literature and culture.

== Publications ==
=== Novels ===
- Identità distorte (Prova d'Autore, 2005 - Martoglio Prize)
- Trinacria Park (Edizioni e/o, 2013 - Vittorini Prize);
- Cetti Curfino (La nave di Teseo, 2018).
- Il sangue della Montagna (La nave di Teseo, 2021).
- Quel che facciamo dell'amore (La nave di Teseo, 2026).

=== Essays ===
- "Letteratitudine, il libro - vol. I - 2006-2008" (Azimut, 2008);
- "L’e-book è il futuro del libro" (Historica, 2011);
- "Letteratitudine, il libro - vol. 2" (Historica, 2012);
- "Letteratitudine 3: letture, scritture, metanarrazioni" (LiberAria, 2017);

=== Short stories ===
- "La coda di pesce che inseguiva l’amore" (Sampognaro & Pupi, 2010 - "Più a Sud di Tunisi" Award 2011), with Simona Lo Iacono;
- short stories collection "Viaggio all’alba del millennio" (Perdisa Pop, 2011 - Sebastiano Addamo International Prize);
