= Massimo Meola =

Italian footballer

Personal information
- Date of birth: December 25, 1953 (age 72)
- Place of birth: Biella, Italy
- Height: 1.95 m (6 ft 5 in)
- Position: Goalkeeper

Senior career*
Years	Team	Apps	(Gls)
1971–1974	Biellese	68	(0)
1974–1976	Roma	4	(0)
1976–1979	Sorrento	79	(0)
- * Club domestic league appearances and goals

Massimo Meola (born December 25, 1953) is an Italian former footballer who played as a goalkeeper. He played 4 games in Serie A in the 1975–76 season for A.S. Roma.
