= Francesco Sacchetti =

Professor at the University of Pavia and physician

Francesco di Riccardo Sacchetti (died in or before 1473), a member of an illustrious Tuscan family, was a doctor of medicine and professor of logic and law at the University of Pavia, Italy from 1449-69.

His son, Francesco di Francesco Sacchetti, a minor in 1473, was also a doctor of arts and medicine; he was taken prisoner after the battle of Pavia, 1525, and seems to have died in captivity in Naples.
