= Massimo Panizzi =

Italian Army Major General

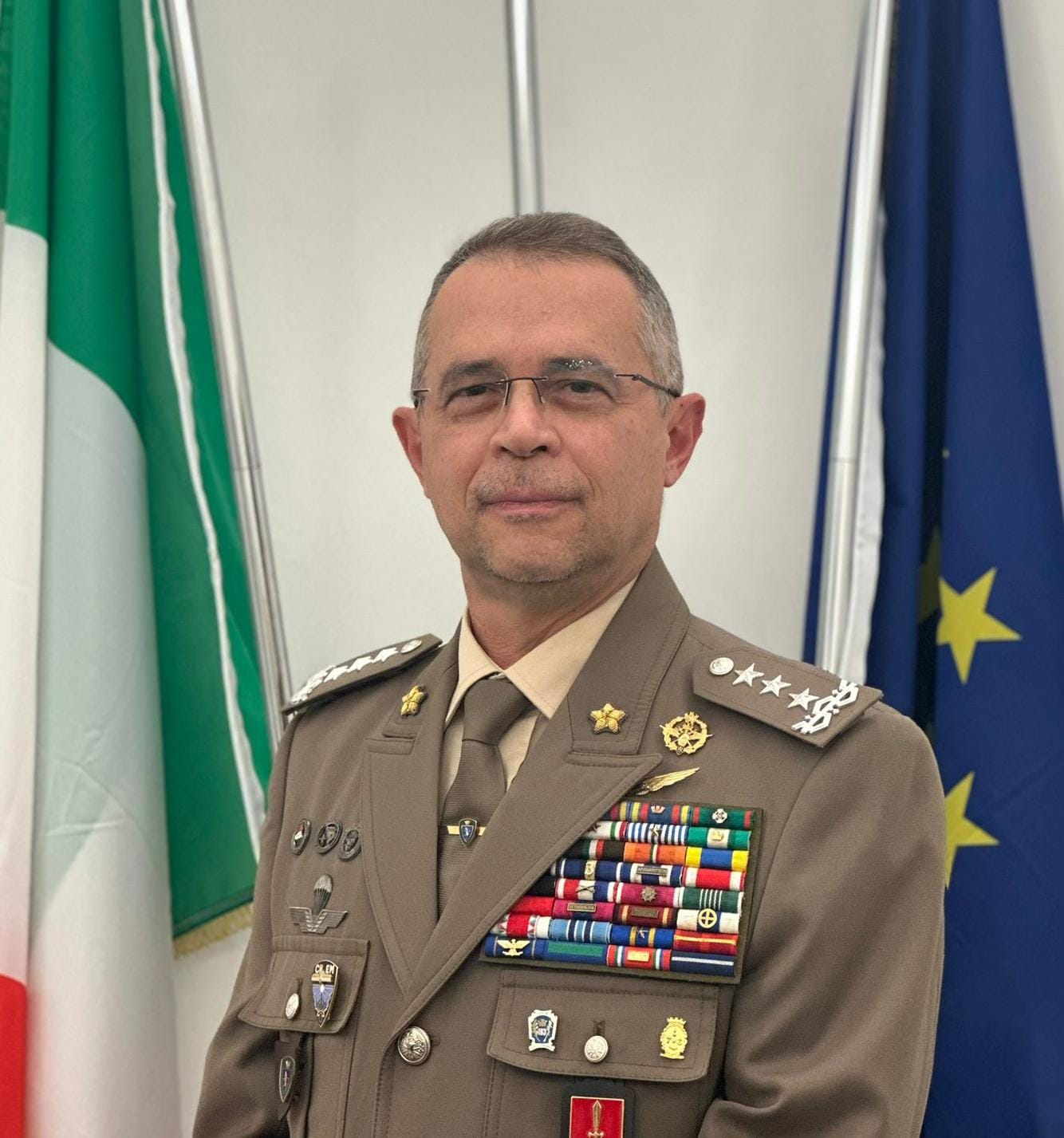
- General Massimo Panizzi, Commander of the Military Geographic Institute in Florence
- Born: 10 October 1962 (age 64); Marina di Carrara, Italy
- Military career
- Allegiance: Italy
- Branch: Italian Army
- Service years: 1981–2024
- Rank: Lieutenant General
- Commands: Alpini Battalion "Susa" 8th Alpini Regiment Alpine Brigade "Taurinense" Comando Regione Militare Nord
- Conflicts: NATO SFOR and IFOR – Bosnia and Herzegovina NATO KFOR – Kosovo Operation Ancient Babylon – Irak NATO Resolute Support Mission – Afghanistan

Massimo Panizzi (born 10 October 1962) is an Italian Army Lieutenant General who currently serves as the Commander of the Italian Army Territorial Command in Rome and Commander of the Military Geographic Institute in Florence. He previously served as the Italian Deputy Military Representative to the NATO Military Committee and Chief of the NATO Office of the Italian Military Delegation at NATO HQ, Brussels. He participated in numerous international military operations and he has served as the Deputy Chief of staff Support (DCOS SPT) for the NATO Resolute Support Mission in Kabul. He assumed the assignment of Deputy Commander of the Military Command of the Capital in Rome on 19 September 2022. Since August 2023 he assumed the command of the Capital (Territorial) Command within the Italian Army Operational Forces HQ (Rome) and of the Military Geographic Institute (Florence).

== Early life and education ==
Massimo Panizzi was born in Marina di Carrara, in Tuscany, Italy on 10 October 1962. He attended the Military Academy of Modena, he graduated from the University of Turin and he was commissioned into the Italian Army in 1981, becoming an Alpini Officer. He attended the Defence Staff College in Rome, the Centre for High Military Studies and the Institute for High Studies of the National Defense in Paris, the Generals, Flag Officers and Ambassadors' Course (GFOAC). He holds University bachelor's degrees in Pedagogy, Strategic Sciences, International and Diplomatic Relations, and is journalist with expertise in Marketing & Communications. He has contributed to a number of publications and studies.

== Military career ==
In a career spanning almost forty years, Massimo Panizzi has commanded Mountain Troops units at every rank from Lieutenant to Brigadier-General, including the "Susa" Battalion of Pinerolo the 8th Alpini Regiment of Cividale del Friuli – the operational unit of the European Union Battle Group – and the Alpini Brigade Taurinense in Turin transforming it into a key European French-Italian Brigade HQ.

As a Senior Staff Officer, he led the Press Offices of the Italian Army General Staff and of the Italian Ministry of Defence, where he introduced the first Italian Ministerial Policy on Strategic Communication. He also served as Spokesperson and Strategic Communication Advisor to the Chairman of the NATO Military Committee and the NATO International Military Staff.

On 2004 he has published research on the relations between military and Non-Governmental Organizations in the Crisis Response Operations and, on 2010, he elaborated the NATO Military Public Affairs Policy. He also was deputy commander of the Training Command and Application School of the Army, situated in Turin, where he was responsible for the training, education and specialization of all Italian Army Officers.

General Panizzi has served in a number of overseas missions and operations, including Bosnia and Herzegovina with both NATO IFOR and SFOR, Kosovo with NATO KFOR, and Irak as part of Operation Ancient Babylon serving in the HQ of the US-led Multinational Corps Irak, and most recently in Afghanistan where he was Deputy Chief of Staff Support (DCOS SPT) for the NATO Resolute Support Mission in Kabul.

Panizzi is the recipient of a number of honours and awards, including Commendatore Ordine al Merito della Repubblica Italiana, the French Chevalier de la Légion d’Honneur and the US Legion of Merit. From Sept 2019 to Sept 2022 Major General Panizzi has served as the Italian Deputy Military Representative and Head of the NATO Office to the Italian Military Delegation at NATO HQ, Brussels. He assumed the assignment of Deputy Commander of the Military Command of the Capital in Rome on 19 September 2022. Since August 2023 he assumed the command of the Italian Operational Forces Capital (Territorial) Command in Rome and of the Military Geographic Institute in Florence.

== Awards and decorations ==
Commendatore Ordine al Merito della Repubblica Italiana, 2 June 2017
Ufficiale Ordine al Merito della Repubblica Italiana, 27 December 2012
Cavaliere Ordine al Merito della Repubblica Italiana, 27 December 2005
Army Silver Medal for the ITA Army Merit, 28 October 2005
Army Bronze Medal for the ITA Army Merit, 8 March 2000
Army Bronze Medal for the ITA Army Merit, 28 February 2020
Gold Medal for long assignments in Active Commanding positions
Gold Cross for duty seniority;
Maurician medal of Merit for long military duty service
Italian Red Cross Bronze Medal
Italian Medal for International Military Operations
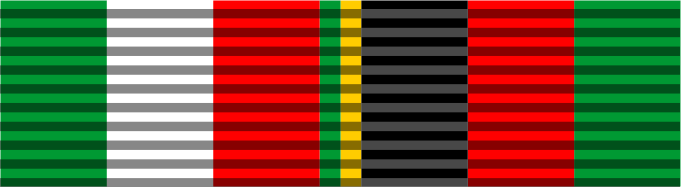
Medal for International Military Operations in Afghanistan
Cross for International Military Operations
French Chevalier de la Légion d’Honneur
U.S. Legion of Merit
French Bronze National Defence Medal
Einsatzmedaille der Bundeswehr in Bronze (Germany) for the NATO Resolute Support Mission in Afghanistan
U.S. Army Commendation Medal for the Operation in Irak
Peace Operations Medal of the Estonian Ministry of Defence
Non-Article 5 NATO Medal for the Operations in Bosnia, Kosovo and Afghanistan
Medalha de D. Afonso Henriques – Mérito do Exército, 1^ Clase (Portugal)
National Defense Medal (Slovenia and Hungary)
