= Massimo Sacchetti =

Italian artist

Massimo Sacchetti is an eclectic contemporary Italian artist from the Italian Alps of Aosta Valley, Italy and has exhibited over the years in various important locations in Italy, Finland, Great Britain, the United States, Germany and France. He is a Lecturer at the Art School of Aosta and he has been collaborating for years with numerous art and design institutes.

The protagonist of Sacchetti's works is Nature, almost a tribute to the Aosta Valley, through its landscapes, caught in the changing of the seasons, which push the observer to reflect on the beauty of the places of the heart and memory, often only evoked by traits, lines and symbols, suspended between abstractionism and symbolism.

He uses all the techniques: drawing, painting, sculpture, graphics, photography and 3D videography. The last two decades are marked by numerous collaborations in internationally important exhibition spaces such as the Lathi Art Tadai Museum, in Finland, the Art Ville de Meyzieu, Lyon, the MACRO Museum of Contemporary Art Rome and Triennale in Milan.

He has been active from at least 1974 who recently had an exhibition of his art at the Palazzo Rosso art museum in Genoa.

== Exhibitions ==
PERSONAL EXHIBITIONS

2017	Residenza d’artista villa Durazzo Bombrini, Cornigliano, GE
2016	Seminario Arte contemporanea e Architettura: architetto Gianluca Peluffo e Massimo Sacchetti Sala conferenze Castello Baron Gamba Museo Arte moderna e contemporanea, Chatillon
2016	Latitudine Longitudine Castello Baron Gamba Museo Arte moderna e contemporanea, Chatillon
2015	Stanno dove sono Galleria Alfredo Meconi e Officine Solimano, Savona
2015	Alito che si condensa Spazio Laura Mayolino, Milano
2012	Tutto ciò Avviene Palazzo Pantaleo Spinola, Genova
2010	Stanno dove sono Ambra Gaudenzi Gallery, Genova
2009	Pathosformel Studio C10H12N20, Torino
2006	Videosegni Spazio T, Saint Cristophe Aosta
2007	Still life? Museo di Palazzo Rosso, Genova
2004	Conversazioni su cultura e società secondo ciclo di seminari Fondazione Chabod, Aosta
2003	la visione del non visibile fondazione Federico Chabod, Aosta
2002	Sensitive Chemical Recognition Museo d'Arte Contemporanea Palazzo delle Papesse, Siena
2002	Pitiriasis Rosea di Gilbert Palazzo Fattinanti Cambiaso, Genova
1997/ 1999	Deposito Invernale The International Institute of Art and Architecture, New York. The American University, Washington DC.
1997	Dall'alto Curtain Arts Gallery, London
1993	Ombra Aperta SALA 1 Mary Angela Schroth, Roma
1991	Da dove nasce la montagna Galleria Rosa Leonardi/V Idea, Genova
1991	Fine Chiesa di San lorenzo, Aosta
1989	Le Tracce della Memoria Santa Maria di Castello, Genova
1989	Sull'Idolo Museum of Modern Art Kemi Suomi, Finland Museum of Modern Art Tampere Suomi Finland Museum of Modern Art Kokkola Suomi, Finland Museum of Modern Art Joensuu Suomi, Finland

COLLECTIVE EXHIBITIONS

2017	Latitudini dell’Arte Germania/Italia Palazzo Ducale, Genova
2011	VideoArt Fest Teatro delle Muse, Ancona
2011	Monitor Space La Triennale di Milano, Milano
2010	Violenza invisibile Macro Museo di Arte Contemporanea, Roma
2010	Ravello LAB Villa san Rufolo Ravello, Salerno
1992	Exhibition Lahti Art Tadai Museum, Lahti Finland
1992	Art Ville de Meysieu Lyon, France
1991	Subtransalpina Fortezza di Bard, Hone Bard Valle d’Aosta
1990	Spezzare il Tetto Palazzo Lanfranchi, Pisa
1990/ 1991	Luoghi Poetici della Sperimentazione Galleria Civica Sampierdarena, Genova
'1990'	Junge Malerei in Italien Bildende Kunst, Muchen
