= Massimo Berdini =

Italian footballer

Personal information
- Date of birth: 3 October 1958 (age 68)
- Place of birth: Rome, Italy
- Height: 1.75 m (5 ft 9 in)
- Position: Defender

Senior career*
Years	Team	Apps	(Gls)
1975–1978	Roma	1	(0)
1978–1979	Omegna	26	(1)
1979–1981	Viterbese	67	(2)
1982–1984	Casalotti	45	(1)
- * Club domestic league appearances and goals

Massimo Berdini (born 3 October 1958) is a retired Italian football player.

His debut game in the 1977–78 season for A.S. Roma remained his only game in Serie A. He also made 26 appearances in Serie C2 for Omegna.
