= Alaniz =

Alaniz is a surname originating in Spain. Notable people with the surname include:

- Lourdes Alaniz, Mexican artist
- Martín Alaniz (born 1993), Uruguayan footballer
- Maximiliano Alaníz (born 1990), Argentine footballer
- Ricardo Alaníz Posada (born 1937), Mexican businessman and politician
- Rico Alaniz (1919–2015), Mexican-born American actor
- Ruben Alaniz (born 1991), American baseball player
