= Lourdes Alaniz =

Mexican painter and graphic artist

Lourdes Alaniz is a Mexican painter and graphic artist whose work has been recognized with exhibition in Mexico’s Salón de la Plástica Mexicana.

== Studies ==
Alaniz began her formal art studies at the Academy of San Carlos in 1952, studying drawing under Benjamín Coria. Later, she studied painting at the Instituto de Arte de México under Sebastián Coviza and watercolors with Alfredo Guati Rojo. She continued studying at workshops with Gustavo Alaniz and Hermenegildo Sosa. In the 1990s, she studied various forms of etching and printing in various workshops and at the Escuela Nacional de Artes Plásticas.

== Career ==
She has regularly exhibited her work in Mexico, the United States and Europe (Poland, Belgium, Italy, Lithuania and England). Her more recent exhibitions have mostly been with the Academy of San Carlos, where she works on various projects including a 1998 individual exhibition, but she has also had individual shows at the Salón de la Plástica Mexicana in 2001, at the Trazo Taller de Arquitectura event in Colonia Roma, Mexico City in 2002 and at the Reforma Athletic Club in San Juan Totoltepec. She regularly contributes to the annual collective exhibition of the Salón de la Plástica Mexicana.

Alaniz has given numerous art classes for children.

Her work can be found in public and private collections in various parts of the world including those of the Buenos Aires Museum of Modern Art, the Museo Ideale Leonardo da Vinci, the Universal Graphic Museum in Cairo, the Brunico Civic Museum and the Museo de la Ville de Locie.

In 1978, she won the Salón de Pintores Aficionados a la Acuarela (Amateur Watercolorists Salon). She later won awards for her work in Poland and Lithuania. In 1999 the artist won the State of Mexico Graphic Biennal and in 2000 the bronze at the International Graphics Biennal in Qingdao, China.

In 2021, the Salón de la Plástica Mexicana held an exhibit,"ImagenArte," of Alaniz's work.

== Artistry ==
Alaniz’s work have been in watercolor and graphics, which includes a period when she focused on portraits and landscapes in watercolor and oils.
