= Hermenegildo Sosa =

Mexican painter and art professor (born 1946)

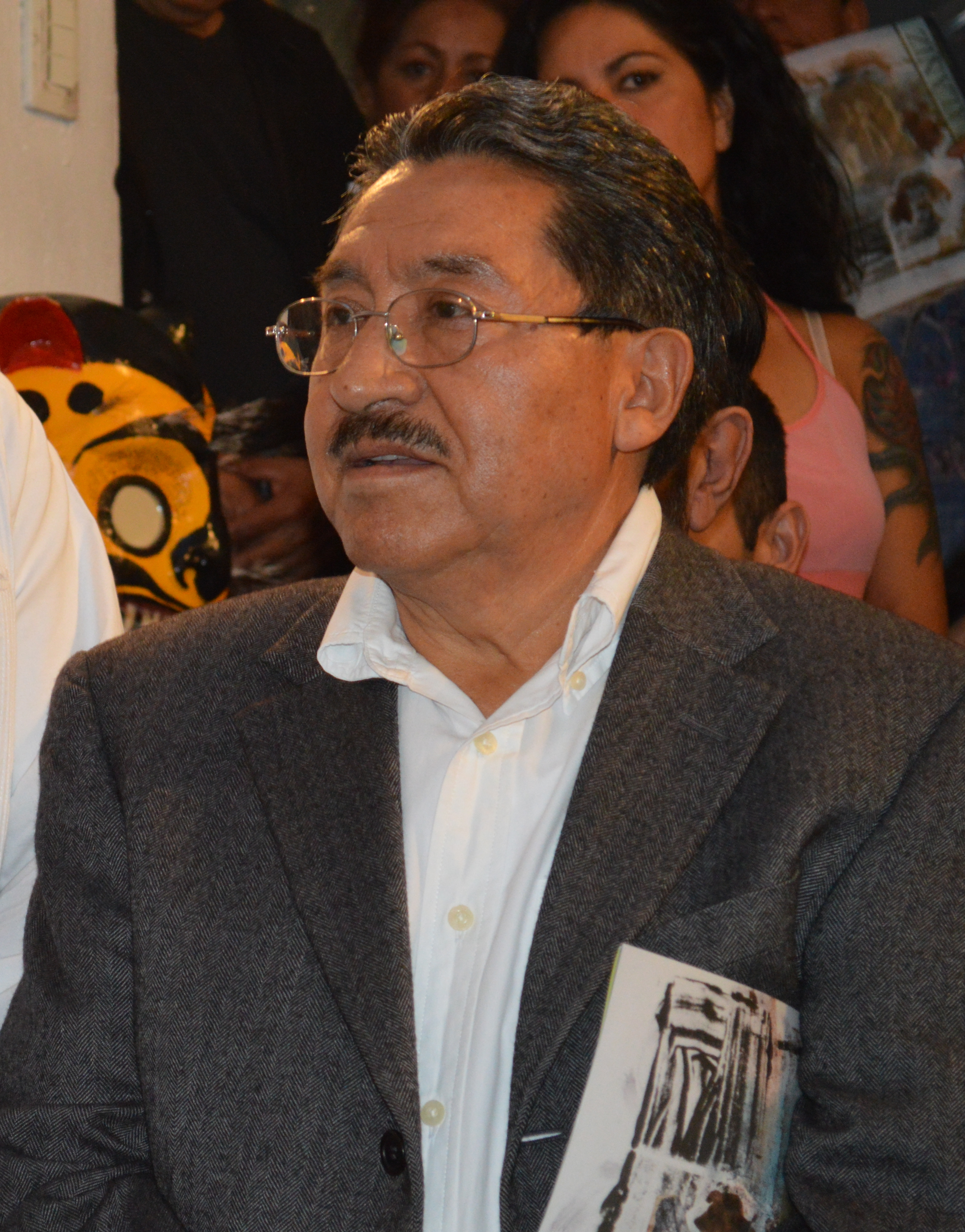
- Born: José Hermenegildo Sosa Zamora; April 12, 1946 (age 80); Jose Maria Morelos Buenavista, Tlaxcala
- Education: Escuela Nacional de Pintura, Escultura y Grabado "La Esmeralda"

Hermenegildo Sosa (born April 12, 1946) is a Mexican painter and art professor who is best known for colorful depictions of Mexican rural landscapes, especially those of his home state of Tlaxcala. He was born there into a farming family, whose economic condition delayed his education as he had to work from a young age. In his teens he arrived to Mexico City to work as a domestic, but this allowed him to attend school, including painting classes. Eventually, he entered the Escuela Nacional de Pintura, Escultura y Grabado "La Esmeralda", where he eventually gained a career as a professor.

Sosa's has been extensively exhibited in the Mexico City area, his home state of Tlaxcala and has been exhibited in the United States and Germany. His work has been recognized with various awards, publications, tributes and membership in the Salón de la Plástica Mexicana.

== Background ==
Sosa (full name José Hermenegildo Sosa Zamora) was born in the small rural community of San Andrés Buenavista, Tlaxcala, northwest of Mexico City. He comes from a family of farm workers, including his father Rafael Sosa, who was also an ejido (communal farm) leader. His mother was Cirenia Zamora, a homemaker, with Sosa being the twelfth of their fourteen children. His creative tendencies appeared early and were encouraged by his parents; however; his father was killed when Sosa was only five. This forced his mother to leave San Andrés with her three youngest children, which included Hermenegildo, and live in the larger town of Apizaco, Tlaxcala, arriving when Sosa was eight. Sosa had to start working while very young, doing a number of jobs to support himself and his family. This included herding sheep, which later influenced his art as it allowed him to observe nature and the cycle of the seasons.

Economics and his family situation meant that he began and completed school late, but he maintained his determination to get an education, which in later life would allow him to support his mother and siblings. At age ten, he went to Mexico City to work as a domestic service at a private home, initially sending money home to his mother. He began primary school at age twelve at the Centro Escolar Revolución, but in his fourth year won a recital competition among primary schools in Mexico City. In 1961, at age 15, he is reunited with his mother, who had remarried and moved to Mexico City as well. Sosa went on to study middle school at the Maestra Guadalupe Núñez y Parra School in 1964, the same year he exhibited a series of watercolors he did at the school. The school promoted his work.

However his stepfather opposed Sosa's artistic ambitions and eliminated his chances of entering the National School of Arts (ENAP) in 1967 by destroying needed documents in Sosa's face. So a few weeks later, Sosa took a painting class at the Casa del Lago, an institution supported by the National Autonomous University of Mexico. Here he learned the basics of composition, working during his free time and on any material from napkins to actual canvas. The teacher of this class, José Rivera, arranged to allow Sosa to attend an ENAP class as an unmatriculated student with Fermín Rojas, and Sosa participated in an exhibition with the class. Rojas recognized the young man's talent and encouraged him to continue his studies. However, Sosa could not continue at the school because of his lack of credentials.

Instead, he finished middle school at age 23 and was able to get steady employment a buy a modest house in the Granjas Valle de Guadalupe, Seccion B, a housing tract just outside the bounds of Mexico City. This allowed him to distance himself from his stepfather while maintaining a relationship with his mother. By age 26, Sosa had completed high school and enrolled at La Esmeralda, studying from 1973 to 1978, when he earned his bachelor's degree in visual arts. In 1988, he received his master's degree in fine arts from the same institution.

Sosa learned various styles of drawing and painting, but his rural background in part led him to be interested in landscape painting. His art studies allowed him to look at the landscapes around his hometown in a new light, the fields, farms, vegetation, and the colors of the different seasons, along with the sky both day and night. In the 1970s, this format was undervalued and not taught at La Esmeralda . For this reason, Sosa taught himself the art by studying the works of famous landscape artists.

== Career ==
Sosa's career as a painter and teacher has extended from the 1970s to the present. By 1973 his work already gained some recognition from participation in a number of exhibitions, which earned him opportunities to teach classes. This allowed him to leave the more strenuous labor he had done before. Most of his teaching career has been with his alma mater La Esmeralda. In the 1980s, he and a group of students here at the time lobbied the administration to hold landscape painting workshops to be taught by Sosa. They were successful, with the classes taking place on intermittent weekends. In 1982, he passed the exam at La Esmeralda that permitted him to become a full-time instructor.

Sosa had exhibited his work as a student in various collective shows, which his first two individual exhibitions coming in 1978. Just before graduating La Esmeralda, he organized an exhibition at a small restaurant in the Colonia Guerrero neighborhood in Mexico City, which was followed by a second at the Instituto Politécnico Nacional in the same city. Since then he has had individual exhibitions at the Nishizawa Cultural Center, Atizapán de Zaragoza (2010), Hermenegildo Sosa Cultural Center, Tlaxco (2009), Teatro San Benito Abad, Cuautitlán Izcalli (2009), Wimmer Gallery, Munich (2008), National Agriculture Museum, University of Chapingo (2008), Tlaxcala Art Museum (2008), Tlaxcala State Fair (2007), José María Velasco Museum, Toluca (2005, 2007, 2010), Salón de la Plástica Mexicana (2000, 2010), Galería Tere Hass, Mexico City (1998), Tecnológico de Monterrey, Campus Estado de México (1998), Casa de Cultura Juventino Rosas, Mexico City (1996), Museo de Arte Contemporáneo Ateneo de Yucatán (1996), Museo Universitario Contemporáneo de Arte (UNAM) (1995), Aristos Gallery (UNAM) (1994), Modern Art Museum of Toluca (1993), Casa de Cultura in Tlaxco (1992), Marstelle Galería de Arte, Mexico City (1991, 1995), Offices of INFONAVIT, Mexico City (1990), Galería Lourdes Chumacero, Mexico City (1989, 1997), Office of the National Lottery, Mexico City (1987), Centro Cultural José Martí, Mexico City (1986), Casa de la Cultura de Temascalcingo, State of Mexico (1984), Galerías Aura, Mexico City (1984, 1986), Pinacoteca de Tlaxcala (1982, 1988), Galerías de La Esmeralda (1982) and the Universidad de Xalapa (1980). In addition, an exhibition of his work called Nuestra Casa (Our House/Home) toured his native state in 1992, and has been exhibited in numerous collective shows in Mexico and the United States, including New York, Saint Paul, MN, Scottsdale, AZ and Chicago.

The artist's works can be found in public and private collections in Mexico, the United States and Germany, including those of the Modern Art Museum of Toluca, the Pinacoteca de Tlaxcala, the Museum of the City of León, Guanajuato, the Casa de Moneda, in Quito, Ecuador, the Instituto Politécnico Nacional (Zacatenco) and the Tecnológico de Monterrey, Campus Estado de México. In 2006 a selection of his work became a part of the permanent display on landscapes at the José María Velasco Museum in Toluca.

The work Poema was reproduced on a series of Mexican national lottery tickets in 1994, followed by Mis tres amores in 1995.

== Recognition ==
Sosa's work has been recognized in a number of ways. On several occasions, pieces have won awards such as second place Painting Competition of the Salón de la Plástica Mexicana (2005), second place at the Exposición Concurso Homenajo a Francisco Goitia at the Aneteo Anáhuac (1991), the V Bienal de Pintura Rufino Tamayo (1990), the acquisition prize (second place) at the XXI Exposición Concurso de Maestros de Artes Plásticas of SNTE (1982) and was chosen to represent Mexico at the IX Bienal Internacional de Arte in Valparaíso, Chile (1989) .

His work has been critiqued and written about by the likes of Alí Chumancero and Berta Taracena, and various books have been published such as El Color de la Vida presented at the Tlaxcala State Fair in 2007.

Various organizations have held tributes to the artist including Tepecuicatl Concert Hall in the north of Mexico City (1996), José María Velasco Museum in Toluca (2010) and the Pinacoteca de Tlacala in 1988.

Sosa was accepted into the Salón de la Plástica Mexicana and in the early 2000s he served as the board's president.

In 2011 the city of Tlaxco inaugurated the Hermenegildo Sosa Cultural Center, and in 2012 he received the Galardón San Benito Abad from the Universidad del Lago in Cuautitlán Izcalli.

Sosa's teaching has received various recognitions from La Esmeralda.

== Artistry ==
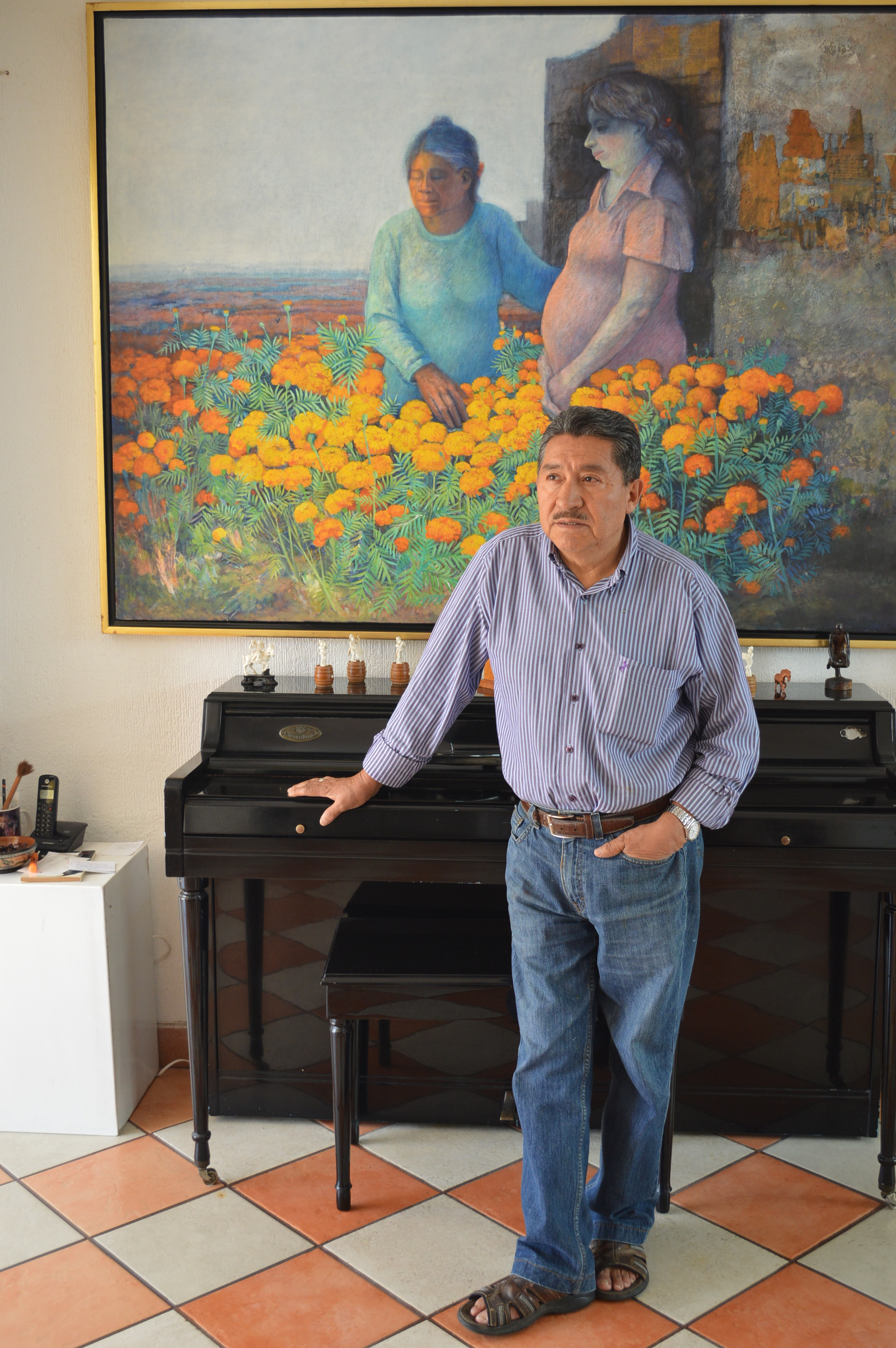
Artist at home with one of his works in the background

Sosa's work has focused on painting with some drawing, with his best-known work being depictions of the nature of rural Mexico, especially that of his home state of Tlaxcala with intense colors and forms, with colors such as turquoise, violet and yellow. Most of his works were painted in situ, looking directly at what he was capturing on canvas. Common elements include foliage, mountains, volcanoes, with flowers used to symbolize life. His depictions of nature are colorful and connect earth and sky. They also indicate movement and metamorphosis. Most of his depictions of rural Mexico relate to his experience of this environment, and is a celebration of Mexican life. However, some works can depict the negative, especially its hardships. The change from rural to urban life made a profound impact on the artist during his life. His landscape work was not limited to rural scenes but urban ones as well, especially around the edges of cities. Whiile his rural scenes are generally positive and colorful, his depictions of urban life tend to be dramatic and chaotic, depicting pollution, buildings in poor condition and traffic. demonstrating urban sprawl and its effects on the environment and the poor. Urban life is depicted as chaotic, bitter and hard.

He also has done still lifes, interior environments, including furniture and nude figures in some kind of setting. His still lifes are an exploration of form and color, with the creativity most apparent in the choice of elements and the visual angle. Drawings tend to be in black and white, especially in an early "gray period."

Sosa's work blends elements of impressionism and expressionism with some abstraction. Influences include the works of Dr Atl, Francisco Goitia, José María Velasco, José Clemente Orozco, Joaquín Clausell, Rufino Tamayo, Luis Nishizawa, Vincent van Gogh, William Turner, Camille Pissarro, Claude Monet and Cezanne.

According to Alí Chumacero:

His main world, his achievement as an artist, is the composition of flowers, plants, mountains, volcanos and colors. Flowers are a tribute to life, illuminated by the Sun, along with marigolds and sunflowers that appear in the shadows on occasion. Sosa’s work is also metamorphosis, movement, as much in the clouds and sky as in the field and earth, in the yellows of the flowers and the green that extends all the way to the horizon and joins with the sky that acquires the yellow tones of the Sun.

== Bibliography ==
- Hermenegildo Sosa: 45 Años de Poética Plástica. Toluca, Mexico: Museo José María Velasco. 2010.
- Herminegildo Sosa: Imágenes del alma. Tlaxcala, Mexico: Tlaxcala State Arte Museum. 2008.
- Hermenegildo Sosa: Images of the Soul- Die Farben der mexikanischen seele. Munich, Germany: Galerie Wimmer. 2008.
- Hermenegildo Sosa:Interpretaciones. Mexico City: Galería Universitaria Aristos (UNAM). 1995.
- Rivera, Rodolfo, ed. (2007). Hermenegildo Sosa: El color de la vida. Mexico City: Alamos Color SA de CV. ISBN 970-95119-0-4.
