= Berta Taracena =

Mexican historian, cultural researcher and art critic (1925–2021)

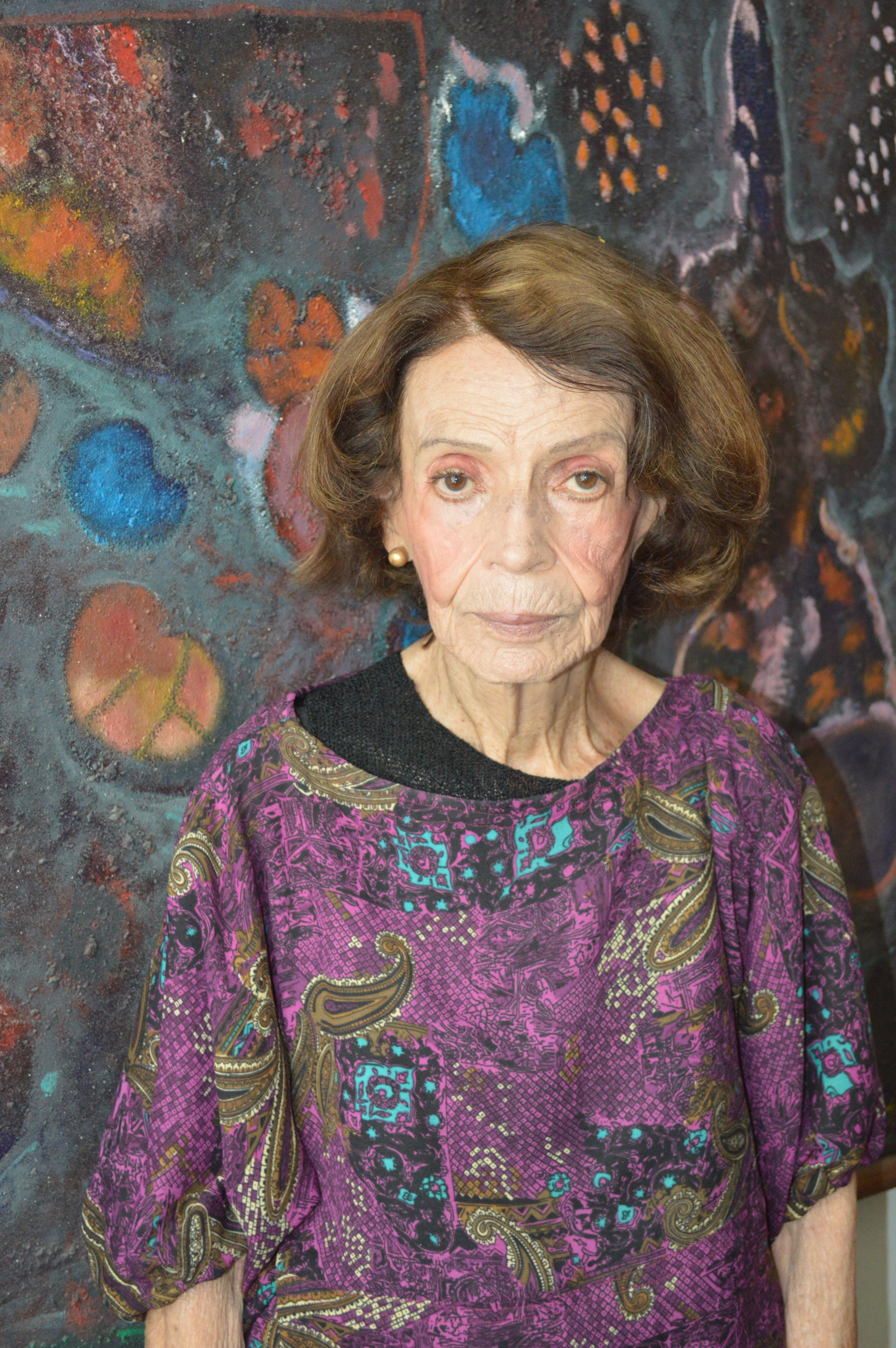
- Taracena in front of Señoritas de Tecuala by Vlady at her home in Mexico City
- Born: 1925; Mexico City
- Died: 9 January 2021 (aged 95); Mexico City
- Occupations: historian, cultural researcher and art critic

Berta Taracena (1925 - 9 January 2021) was a Mexican historian, cultural researcher and art critic.

== Early life ==
Taracena was born in Mexico City in 1925, to a family which was interested in culture. Her father was a Mexican senator and friend of Carlos Chávez, the director of the Palacio de Bellas Artes. This allowed her to earn a quality education, receiving a bachelor's and master's degree in Mexican history from the Universidad Nacional de México. Her master's thesis was done on the work of Jesús Reyes Ferreira, whom she knew personally. She also studied and worked under academics such as Francisco de la Maza and Justino Fernández.

== Career ==
She began her writing career young, publishing about two articles a week, generally reviewing current trends in art, along with art news. She also began doing research work, writing and editing books, along with museum curating. She worked with other notables in Mexico’s art world such as Fernando Gamboa. Her specialty was Mexican visual art, having written hundreds of essays, articles and books as well as appearing at conferences. She focused on the continuity of Mexican art from its pre-Hispanic roots to the present. She published notable books on artists such as Diego Rivera, Manuel Rodríguez Lozano, Vladimir Cora, Leopoldo Flores, Gogy Farías and Antonio Ramírez, as well as Estética del arte mexicano en el tiempo in 2006.

She has stated that Mexican art “constitutes a singular and unique phenomenon, owing to a mixture of traces and elements that bring together an idea of an original cohesion, created by the qualities of monument, and rich imagination. Form, line, color, fantasy and meaning are woven to define an idea of art with particular traits.”

In 2009, the Universidad Autónoma del Estado de México held a tribute to her life's work.
