= La Barca de la Fe =

The Boat of Faith
- La Barca de la Fe
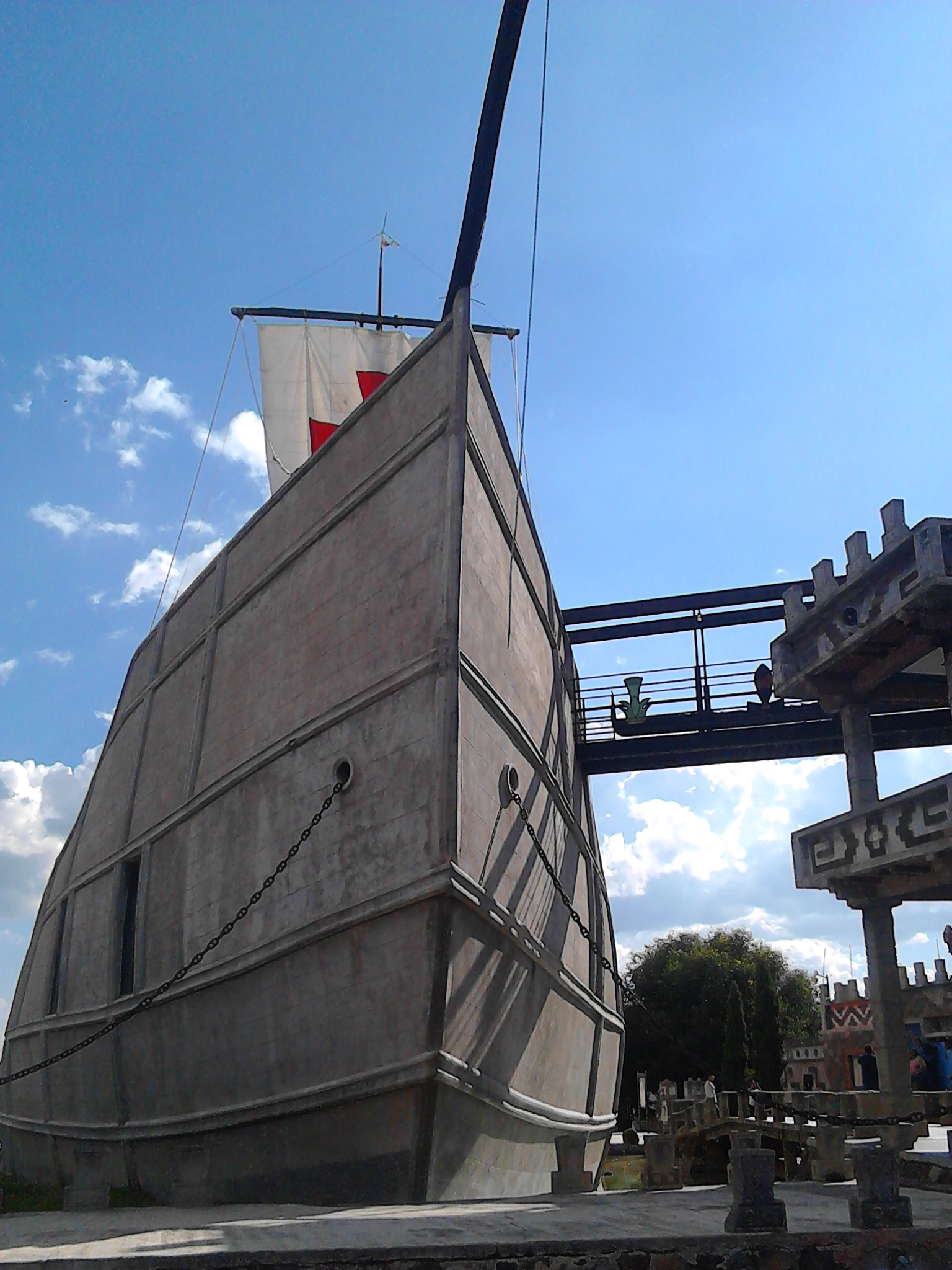
- Photo of the front of the temple

Religion
- Affiliation: Catholicism
- Patron: Saint Andrew

Location
- State: Tlaxcala
- Country: Mexico
- Interactive map of The Boat of Faith

Architecture
- Architect: Arnulfo Mejía Rojas

La Barca de la Fe (in English: "The Boat of Faith") is a Catholic church located in the municipality of Tlaxco, in the state of Tlaxcala, Mexico. The church was built in the 1970s and 1980s and is known for its unique design, which is inspired by a boat. The church is made of concrete and has a large, wooden cross on the roof. The interior of the church is decorated with religious paintings and sculptures. La Barca de la Fe is a popular tourist destination and is known for its beautiful architecture and its peaceful setting.

The church was built by a local priest, Father Arnulfo Mejía Rojas. Father Mejía was inspired to build the church after reading the Bible. In the Bible, Jesus often used boats to teach his followers about faith and salvation. Father Mejía believed that a church in the shape of a boat would be a powerful symbol of faith and hope.

La Barca de la Fe is a destination for pilgrims and tourists alike. The church is surrounded by mountains and forests. The church is also known for its architecture and its atmosphere.

== History ==
According to information from the region itself and some interviews conducted with its architect, Arnulfo Mejía Rojas, hundreds of years ago, the region currently occupied by the population was a settlement of the Otomi people, which belonged to the Pre-Columbian Empire of Tlaxcala.

However, in the 1930s, during the presidency of Lázaro Cárdenas del Río, a land redistribution took place, resulting in the expropriation of the lands from the hacienda named "Saint Andrew." As a result, the chapel located within it was privatized, and access was restricted to weekends for the celebration of Mass.

Years later, in 1974, a project for a new temple began on the grounds that were previously a pulque-selling place called "tinacal." However, due to various events within the community, such as the separation of the town, the project was stalled until the arrival of a new priest in 1984. The priest, Arnulfo Mejía Rojas, originally from the southern region of Tlaxcala, had studied "Pre-Hispanic Philosophy." He decided, through a plebiscite with the population, to completely change the design of the church to a larger one and, most importantly, in the shape of a ship.

The justifications presented on the site for choosing this boat-shaped design are as follows: Jesus preached from boats, the boat is a symbol of the church - an instrument of salvation, the boat is a symbol of ecumenism, and this shape was significant to the community.

For this project, the previous foundations had to be demolished as they did not align with the intended design. The boat design was modeled after the first vessel to set foot on Aztec land, La Santa María. However, for cultural reasons, pre-Hispanic motifs were added, such as fretwork, pyramids, sculptures of Quetzalcóatl, among others. To simulate the sea, mini-pools were created. Waves were formed on one side using grass. The temple was consecrated by Monsignor José Trinidad Medel.
