= Arnulfo Mejía Rojas =

Mexican lawyer (1956–2016)

- parish priest
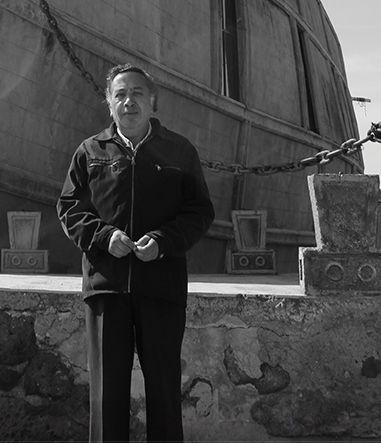
- Mejía Rojas in front of La Barca de la Fe
- Native name: Arnulfo Mejía Rojas
- Church: Catholic
- Diocese: Roman Catholic Diocese of Tlaxcala

Orders
- Ordination: 1974

Personal details
- Born: Arnulfo Mejía Rojas; 15 August 1956
- Died: 16 April 2016 (aged 59) Jose Maria Morelos Buenavista
- Buried: Jose Maria Morelos Buenavista
- Denomination: Catholic
- Residence: Jose Maria Morelos Buenavista
- Occupation: Priest, philosopher

Arnulfo Mejía Rojas (15 August 1956 in Santa Cruz Aquiahuac, Tetlatlahuaca, Mexico – 18 April 2016 in José María Morelos Buenavista) was an engineer, architect, teacher, historian, painter, artist and Catholic priest, most well known for being the creator of The Boat of the Faith.

== Biography ==
Arnulfo Mejia Rojas was born into a humble family of eleven children in the community of Santa Cruz Aquiahuac, in the municipality of Tetlatlahuca, in the state of Tlaxcala, on 15 August 1956. After several attempts to enter the Seminary of Tlaxcala, he was ordained as a priest in 1979, then spent a short period of time as vicar at the Cathedral of Tlaxcala, until he was sent in the same year to the Parish of Apostolos Andreas, in the northwest state. A marginalized area, comprising 14 separated by various valleys and hills, each communities. He always used the dicharacheria. Sometimes he had more authority than the president of the community, because with various festivities and celebrations were community organizing. Shortly after arriving at that community, he began working in raising pigs and cattle. At the same time he became a professor of subjects such as Philosophy, Ethics and Values, Psychology, among others in the same community COBAT. He stayed for 31 years until his retirement in 2015.

== Architectural legacy ==
His most notable work was "La Barca de la Fe".

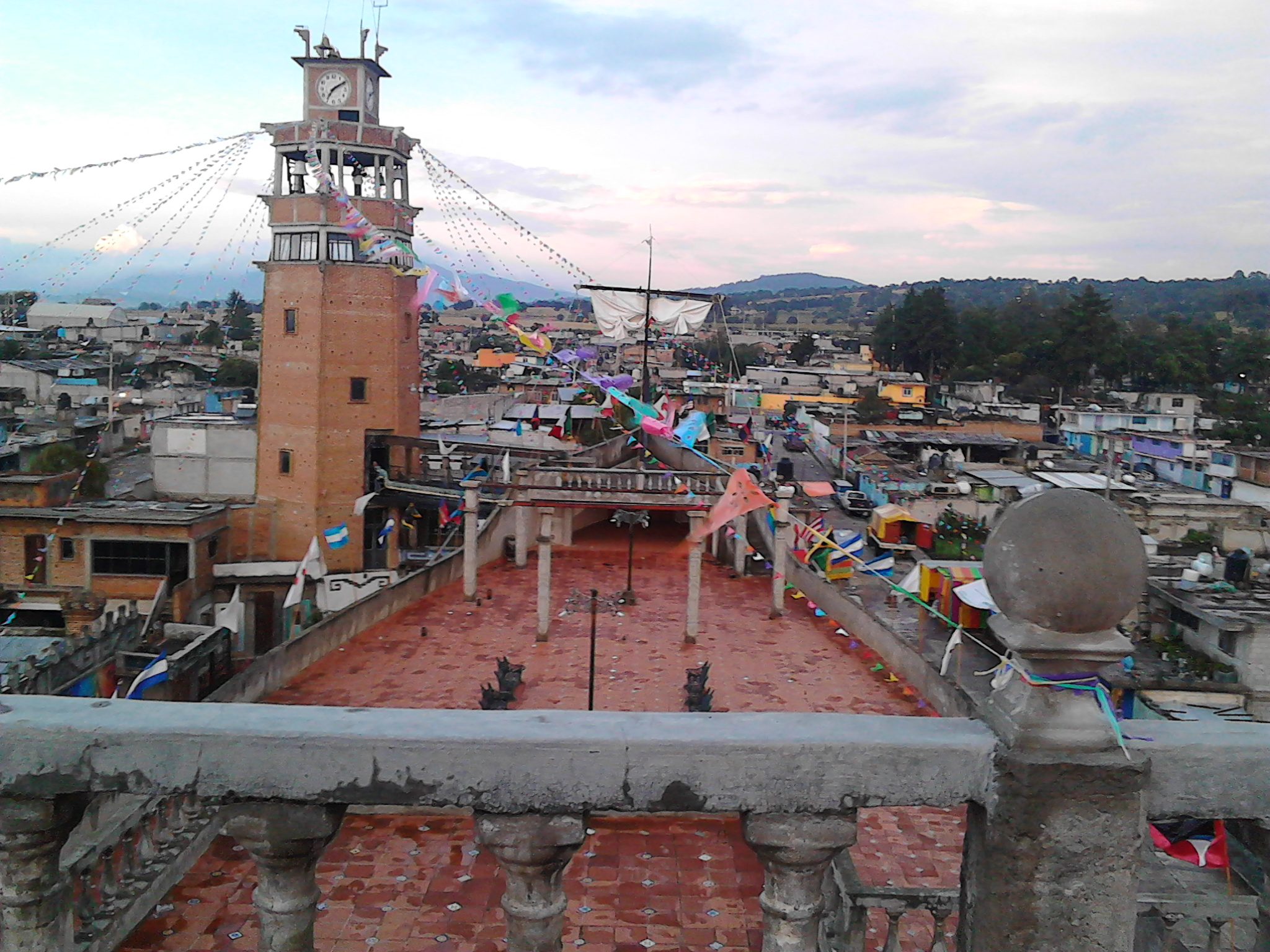
La Barca de la Fe

== Demise ==
=== Background ===
According to some media, on 20 December 2015, after celebrating a Mass in the so-called "boat" had a series of disappointments with some citizens of the community, which ultimately led to a stroke and emergency hospitalization. He remained in the hospital for about three weeks until he left to live in the house of his sister, Adelaida Mejia Rojas, in Contla John Cuamantzi.

After an apparent improvement, he regained 90% mobility in his body, but still struggled to speak.

Previously, the Bishop of the Diocese, had moved for health reasons which affected his health again.

=== Death ===
His death occurred in the community in which he had remained for more than 30 years, José María Morelos Buenavista, due to complications from the stroke he had suffered on 20 December of the year past.

According to reports the Bishop of Tlaxcala, Francisco Moreno Barron, died in the early hours of Monday, 18 April 2016.

=== Interment ===
His funeral was held on 20 April, after two days of fúnebres cults, with an estimated attendance of 5,000 persons, inside the Barca de la Fe, in one of the five crypts that it had ordered to be built some time ago. In February throughout the Novena, were carried out end of this, a group of Aztec dancers eucharistics. All celebrations offered him a last farewell. Meanwhile, they would be left in charge of the parish two priests, one family suyo.

== Statements personalities ==
- O'clock in the afternoon 4ː00, politician Serafin Ortiz Ortiz (brother of former governor Hector Ortiz Ortiz) said through his Twitter account, his condolences and regret the loss of this personage.
- Tlaxco mayor, Jorge Rivera Sosa, lamented the loss of Pastor and explained that he was working to extol the tourist corridor called "The Path of Faith".
- The Bishop of Tlaxcala, Francisco Moreno Barron said in a statement lamenting the loss of sensitive native parish priest of Santa Cruz Aquiahuac.
