= Gogy Farías =

Mexican sculptor and artist (1943–2023)

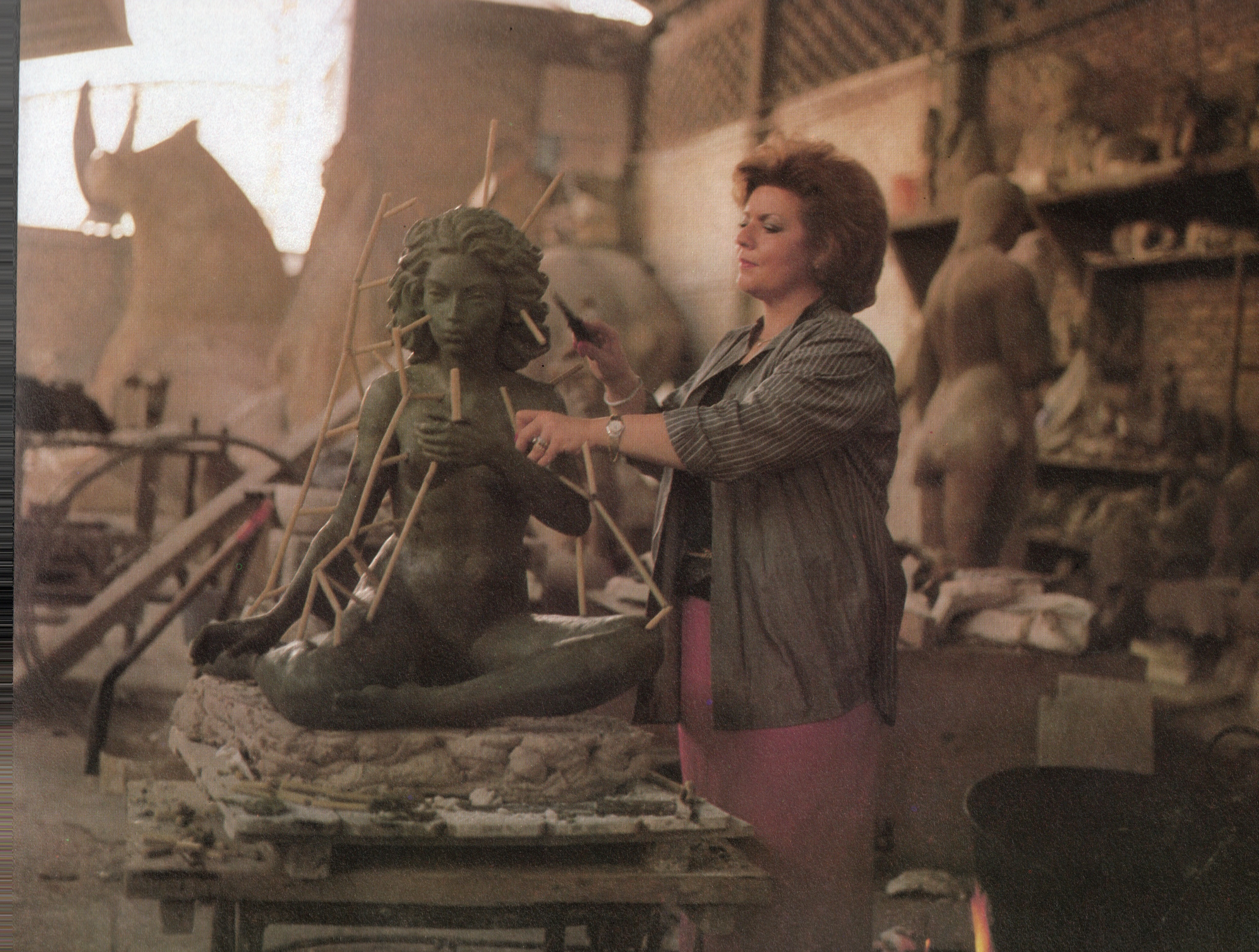
- Gogy Farías in her studio (1988)
- Born: 16 November 1943; Mexico City
- Died: 17 June 2023 (aged 79); Hamburg
- Style: monumental bronze sculpture

Gogy Farías (16 November 1943 – 17 June 2023) was a Mexican sculptor, painter, and visual artist. She is considered one of the first woman sculptresses of contemporary Mexico, her primary focus being monumental bronze sculpture. Her work is permanently exhibited in Mexico City (Bosque de Chapultepec), Ciudad Juarez, Chihuahua, the Ralli Museum Cesarea, Israel, and in Rouen, France. Over 50 of her monumental sculptural works are displayed in public and private squares, churches, and cathedrals in various countries, including eight in the United States: Chicago, Illinois, Florida, California, New Jersey, Georgia, Oklahoma, Texas, and New Mexico.

== Biography ==
Farías was born in Mexico City on November 16, 1943, into an artistic family with Mexican roots on her father's side and Greek heritage on her mother's side. She grew up surrounded by poets, painters, sculptors, and architects who shaped her childhood. Her artistic talent was discovered at the age of 13 when she won first place in an art competition at her school.

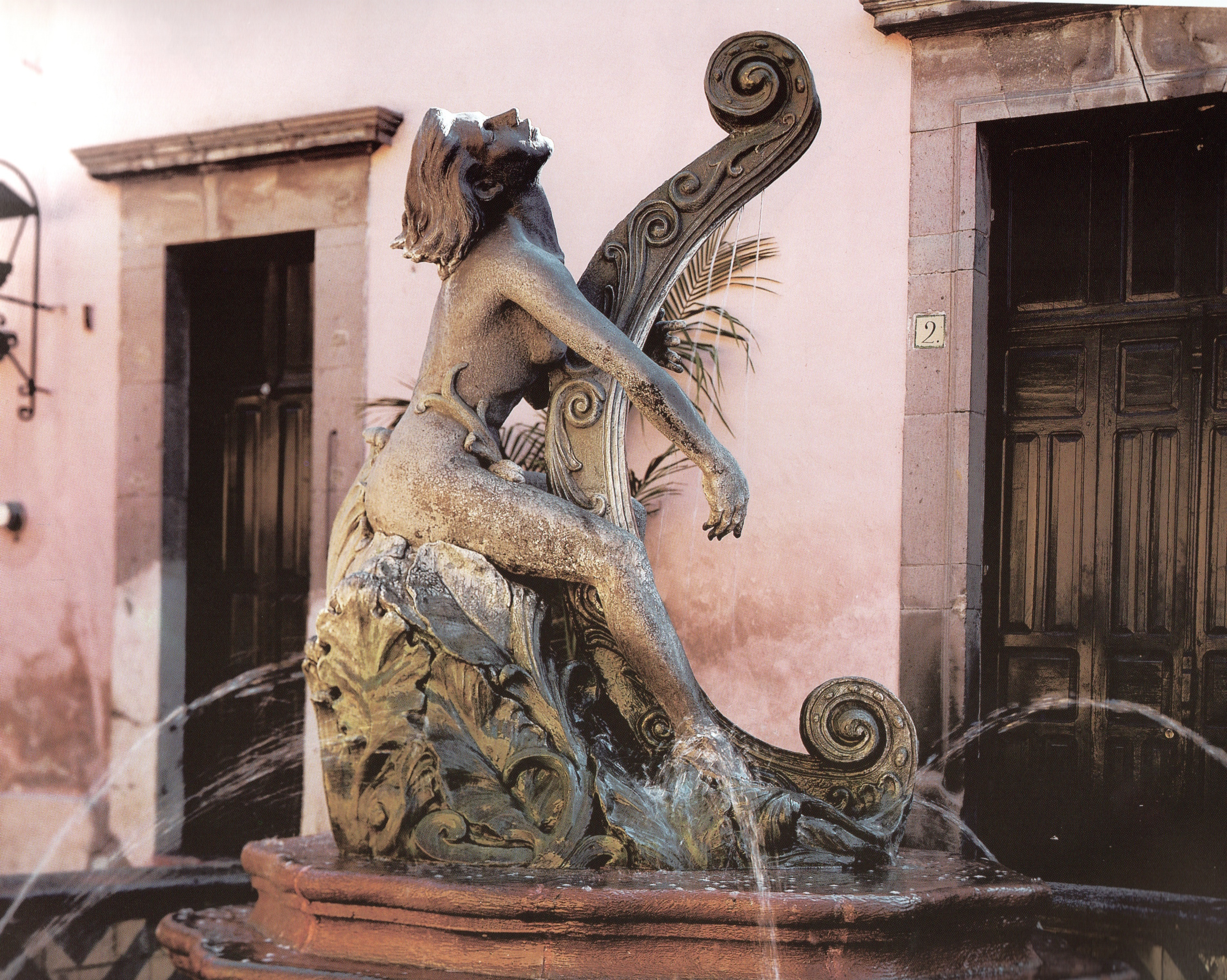
Mujer Con Arpa (Woman With Harp), Gogy Farías, Andador Libertad, Querétaro City, México

In 1958, she enrolled in the School of Plastic Arts at the Universidad Iberoamericana in Mexico City, where Mathías Goeritz was the rector. During this time, she worked and learned from 20th-century Mexican artists such as Manuel Felguérez, Julio Santamaría, Pedro Preux and Kathy Horna. Simultaneously, she began working in the studio of Edgardo Cohlan, a renowned Mexican watercolorist, and attended the National School of Painting, Sculpture, and Engraving at the Instituto Nacional de Bellas Artes en México.

However, her experience in sculpture came from practical learning, working with foundries and artisans in the Valley of Xochimilco, where she could directly engage in casting and the application of patinas. Through this hands-on work, she also learned to sculpt in marble and carved stone.

Her prolific artistic work is exhibited in more than 30 countries, encompassing ecclesiastical art, figurative work, and monumental art, with over 300 pieces. She employed various techniques, including pencil drawing, watercolor, oil painting, ink engravings, lithography, bronze sculpture, onyx stone sculpture, marble sculpture, and bronze murals.

Gogy Farías died in Hamburg on 17 June 2023, aged 79.

== Artwork ==
=== 1965–1975 ===
The first ten years of Farías' artistic production primarily consisted of figurative art based on biblical themes, customs, landscapes, and Mexican flora and fauna.

From 1965 to 1975, Farías created monumental female figures that, in the eyes of art critic Berta Taracena, showcased a "skillful summary of pre-Hispanic and Greek forms, with an incredible synthesis of values ranging from the primitive (Fertility Goddess) to the refined (Star Seller, 1982)".

=== 1976–1985 ===
The years following 1976 were characterized by a maturation of concepts that the artist deemed significant in the art of the time. These concepts included themes such as motherhood and family, nature and the cosmos, and the human capacity to overcome life's challenges. "La Familia" (1980) expresses the importance of living harmoniously with a partner and children.

==== The Importance of Women ====
Continuing with this theme, the artist created a series inspired by the significance of ordinary Mexican women, incorporating customs and traditions. Examples include "La Vendedora de Sandias" (Woman Selling Watermelons, 1984), the series titled "Maternidad" (Maternity, 1981), and "Homenaje a Diego" (Hommage to Diego, 1984). The "Maternidad" series depicts various scenes of interaction between mothers and their children, such as Teaching, Protection, Support, and Tenderness, emphasizing the importance of the early years of life, as the artist believed that "childhood is destiny."

==== Nature and The Cosmos ====
Her series of works dedicated to nature and the cosmos question humanity's place in the universe. In her series titled "Del Caos al Cosmos" (From Chaos to Cosmos) (1983–1984), humans are depicted engulfed in the whirlwind of primitive chaos, emerging from this turbulent stream as masters of their destiny and means. This series echoes the famous works of the 20th century, such as "El hombre controlador del universo " by Diego Rivera and "Catarsis" by José Clemente Orozco. The works in this series refer to two forms: that of man subjugated by negative forces and that of liberated man emerging from the labyrinth as a triumphant figure. Real and mythical elements are blended, using undulating forms, folds, and cavities that contribute to a highly personal sculptural language.

==== The Challenge of The Human Condition ====
The pinnacle of this period was titled "Rompiendo el Círculo" (Breaking the Circle), and "Psiquis se Libera" (Psyche is Freed), a series of sculptures that narrate the transition through difficult moments to psychological resurgence and renewal faced by individuals during periods of depression. The series also provides a philosophical analysis of humanity. Philosopher Erich Fromm and his book "The Art of Loving" were her main guide in this series, drawing inspiration from realizing that the capacity to love is humanity's greatest gift.

The figure of "El Gobernante" (The Ruler), a rider mounted on a three-headed horse made of bronze, evokes the allegory that rulers must be able to tame their ego, public opinion, and power to lead a good government. The work received a prize from Banamex in 1980 and was donated to Mexico's City government by the bank, which is currently found in Chapultepec Park.

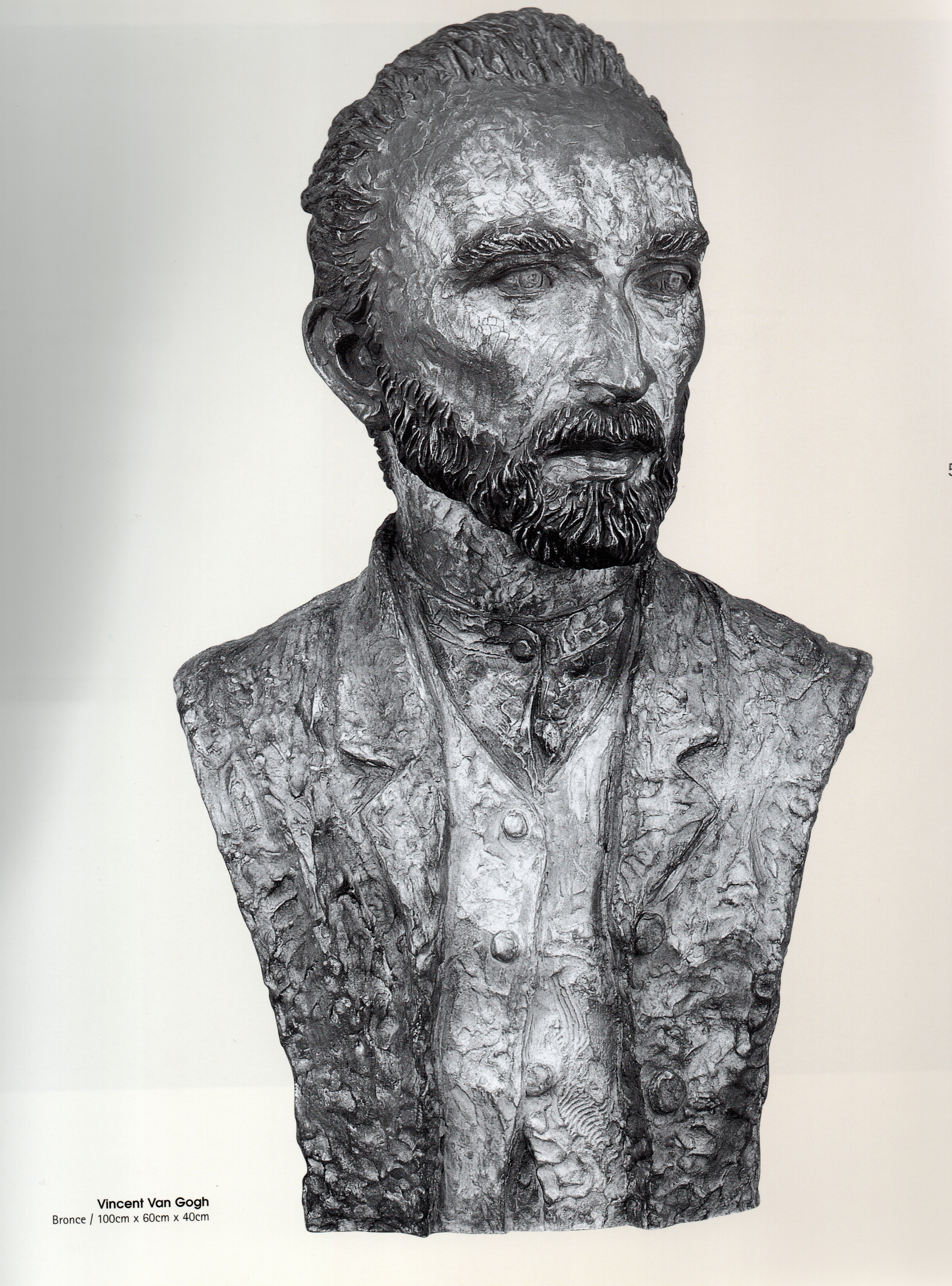
Hommage to Van Gogh, part of the collection of the Musée des Beaux-Arts de Rouen

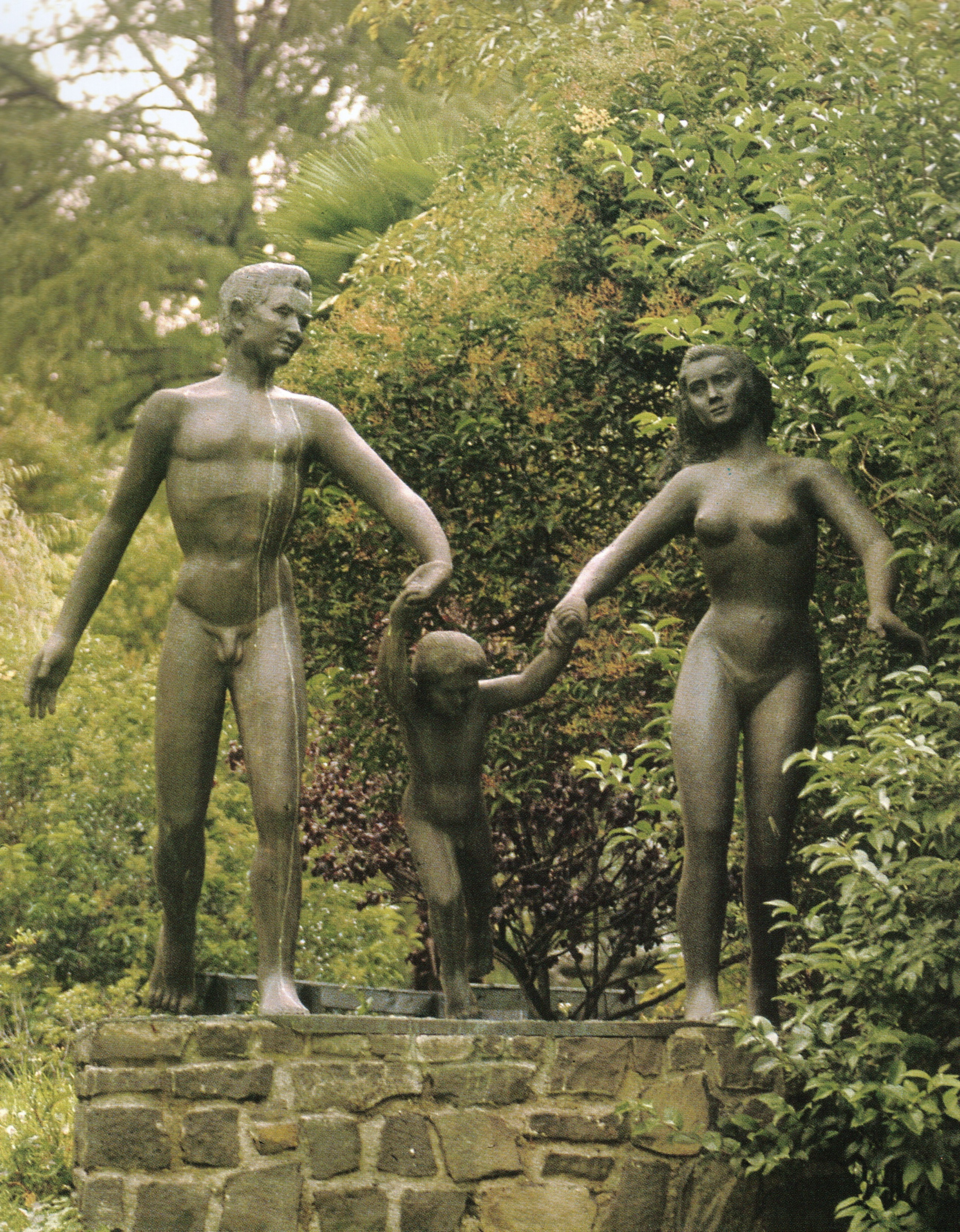
La Familia (1980), Bosque de Chapultepec, Mexico City

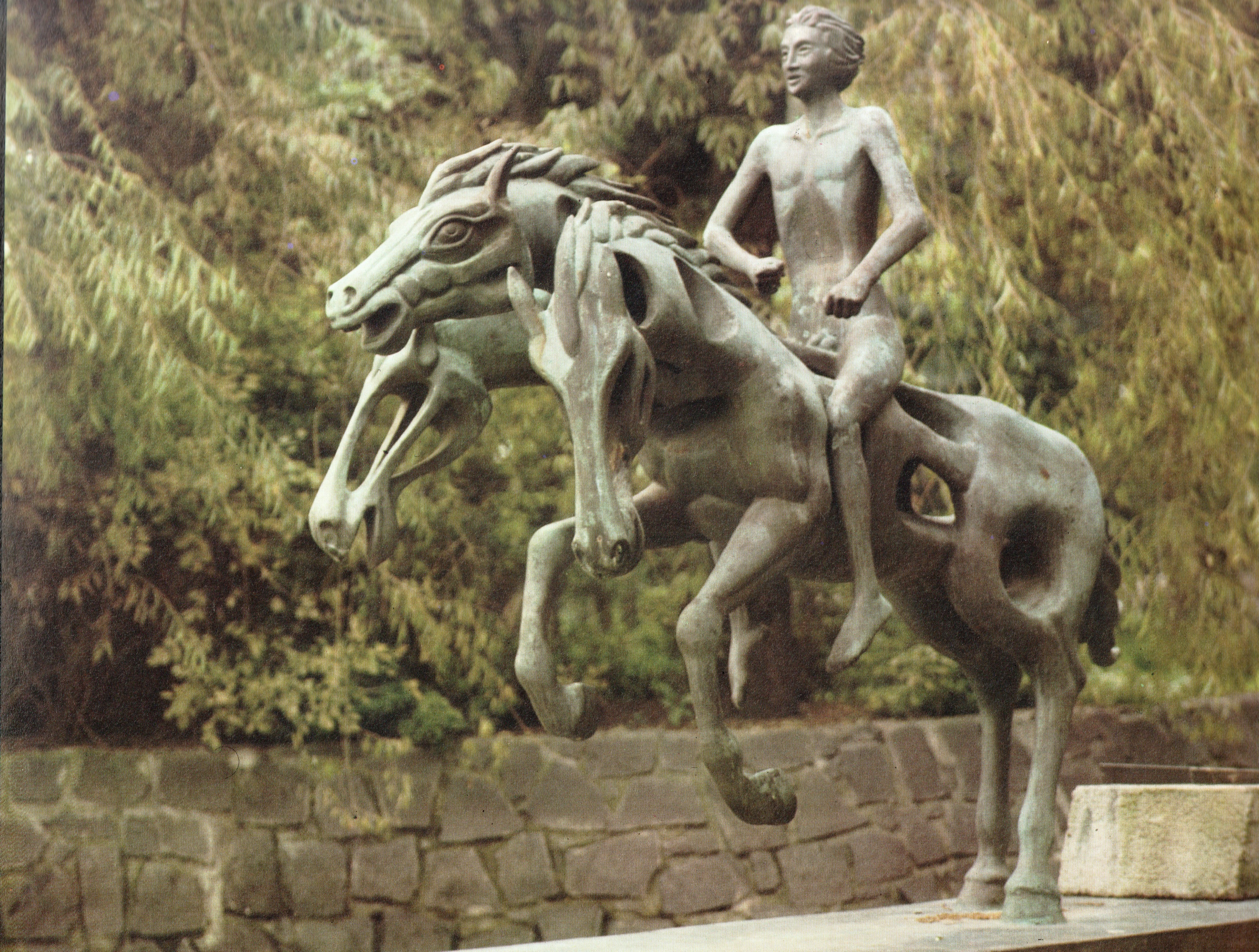
"The Ruler," Gogy Farías (1980). Exhibited in the third section of Chapultepec Park in Mexico City

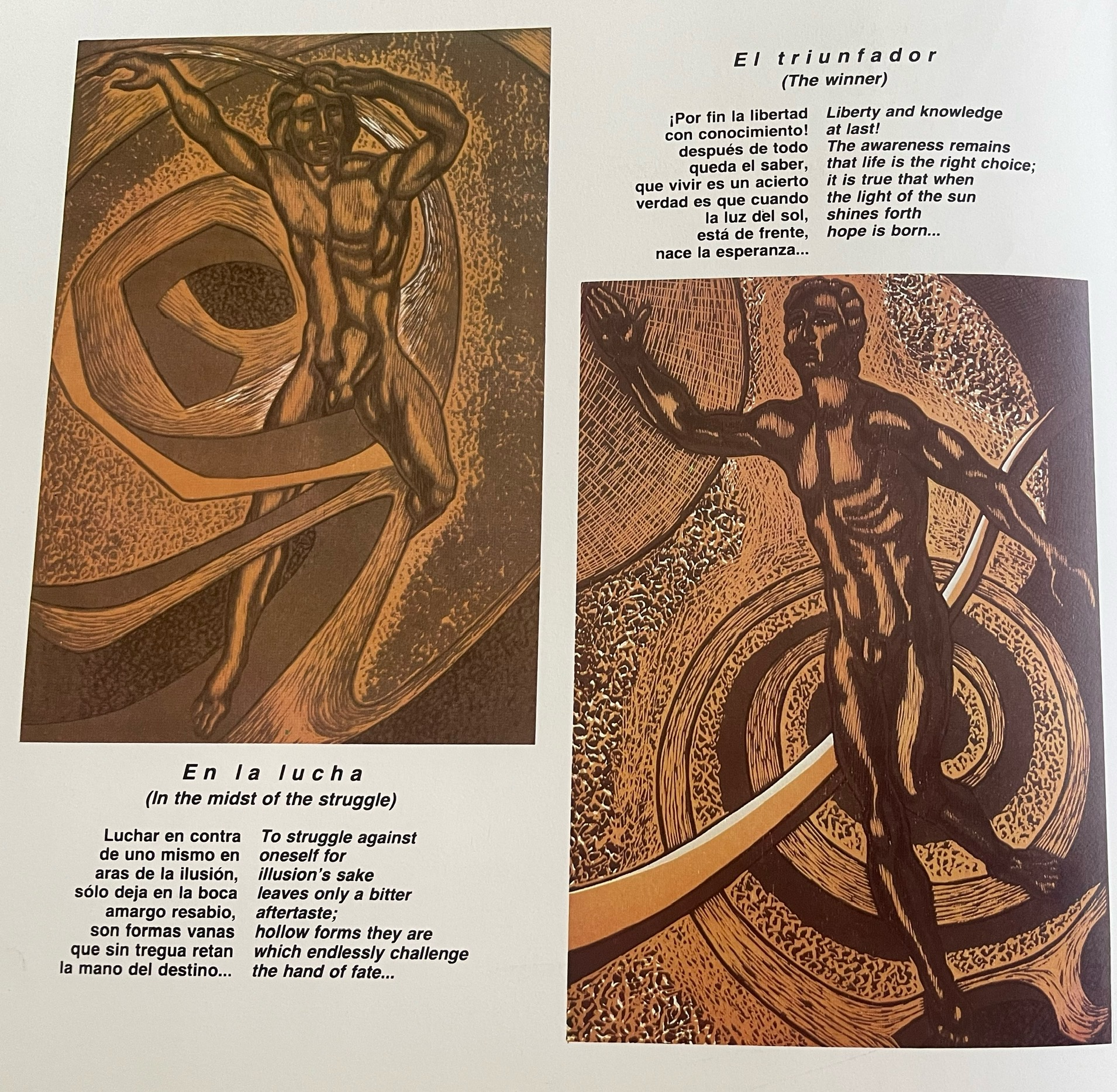
The print series "Caos al Cosmos" (From Chaos to Cosmos) won second place in the International Print Competition in Paris (FIEST, 1986)

== Awards ==
She stood out by receiving various recognitions, including:

- Second place in the National Onyx Carved Sculpture Contest, Mexico.
- Second place awarded by FIEST'86 (International Print Fair in Paris) for woodcut engraving work, Paris, France.
- Award from the Honorable Advisory Council of Mexico City for "Homenaje al Árbol" (Homage to the Tree), a collection of 70 works inspired by the sacred and universal symbolism of the tree, Mexico.
