= Ralli Museum =

Coordinates: 32.515382°N 34.907132°E

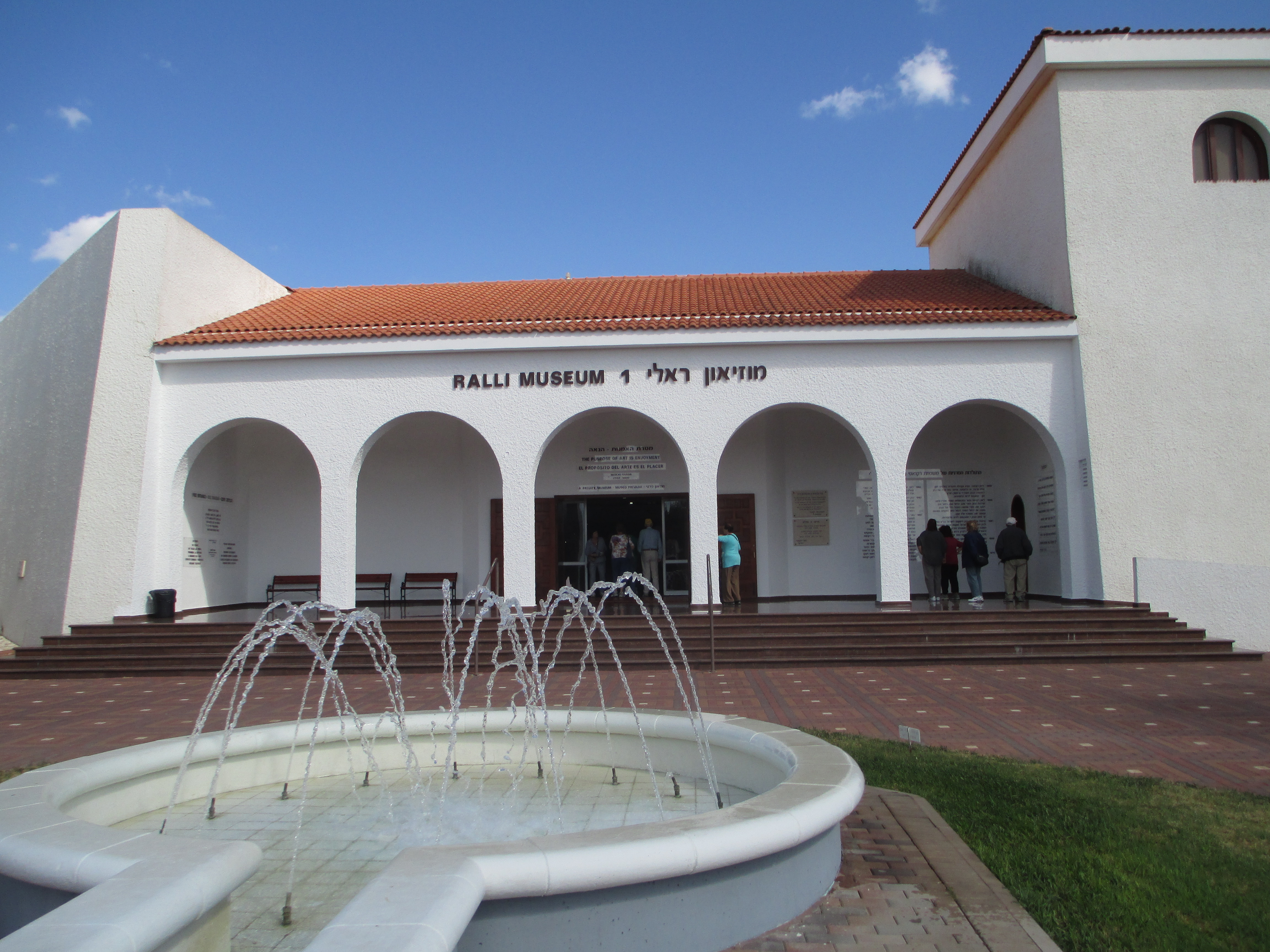
- Ralli 1 Museum
- Location: Rothschild Boulevard, Caesarea
- Type: Art museum, Latin American art, Old Masters

Ralli Museum is a conglomerate of two private art museums under the same name, located in Caesarea, Israel. Both are part of the Ralli Museums international foundation.

== History ==
The Ralli Museum in Caesarea contains two independent collections; Ralli 1 and Ralli 2, of the five non-profit Ralli Museums created by Harry Recanati to exhibit contemporary Latin American Art, commemorate the expulsion of Jews from Spain and Portugal during the Inquisition and preserve the history and art of the Jewish Community of Thessaloniki, which was almost destroyed in the Holocaust.

== Ralli 1 ==
The Ralli 1 Museum building is approximately nine thousand square meters with five exhibit halls in a Spanish Colonial architecture style surrounded by a 40 hectare garden of sculptures. The museum has Salvador Dalí and Auguste Rodin sculptures in its collection, as well as Latin-American sculptures and paintings. The collection also contains works by Arman, André Masson and Gogy Farias. Ralli 1 also has a permanent collection of archaeological objects, found in and around Caesarea, from the Hellenistic, Roman, Byzantine, Islamic and Crusader periods. This collection is created with the help of the Smithsonian Institution and traveled to the USA and Canada in 1988 and 1989.

== Ralli 2 ==
Ralli 2 Museum is dedicated to Spanish Jewry. The building itself is constructed in Moorish Style, with a courtyard at the center featuring a fountain and 12 lions encircling it, similar to Alhambra Palace in Granada. Marble statues of Yehuda Halevi, Maimonides, Spinoza and Ibn Gabirol are also present in the courtyard. The permanent collection contains paintings of European artists from 16th to 18th centuries depicting Biblical themes.

== Gallery ==
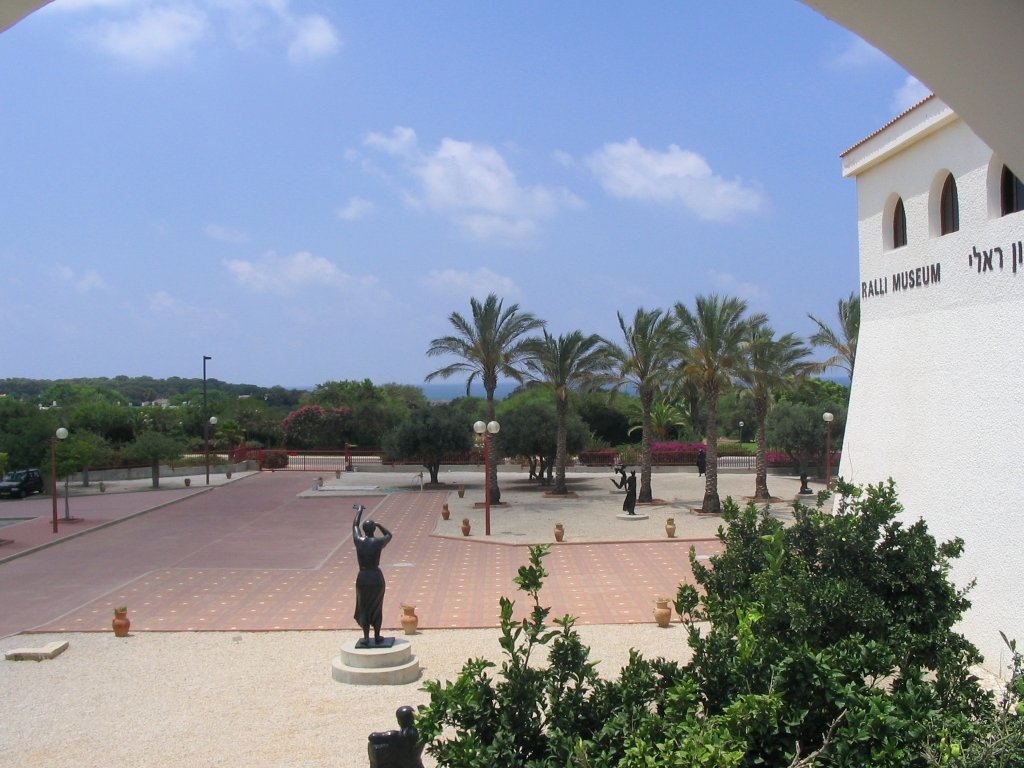
Court of Ralli Museum

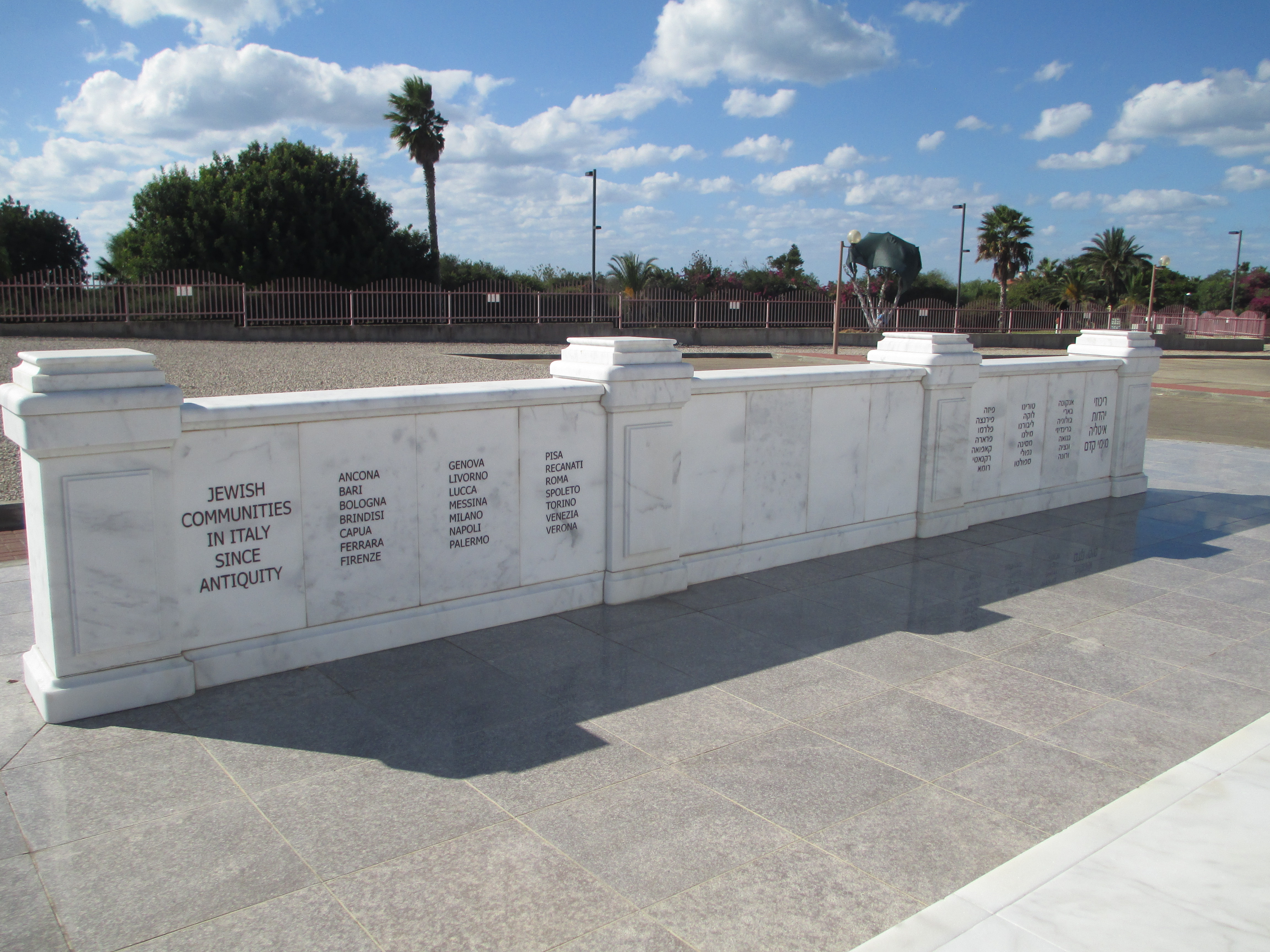
Ralli Museum

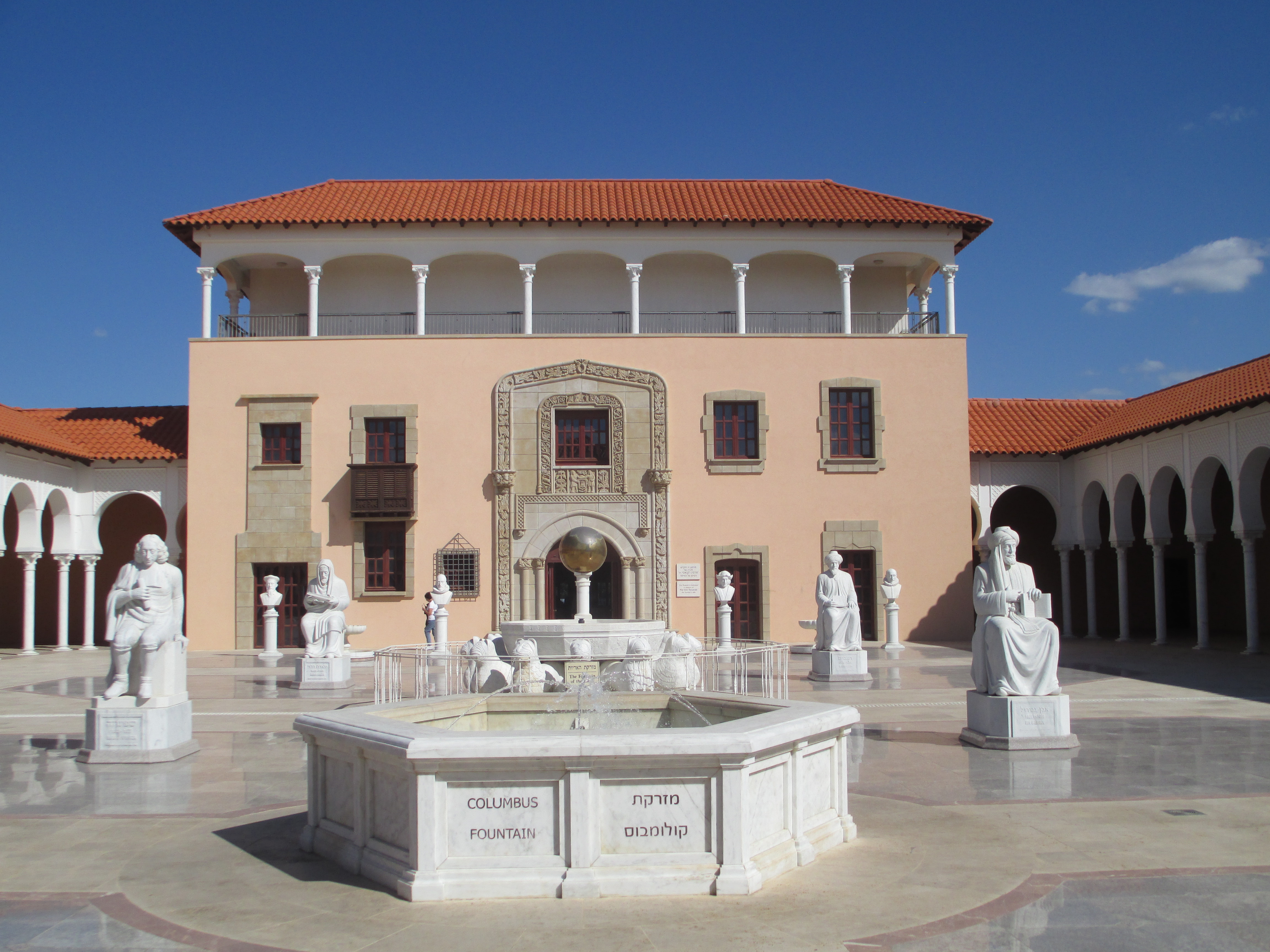
Ralli 2 Courtyard

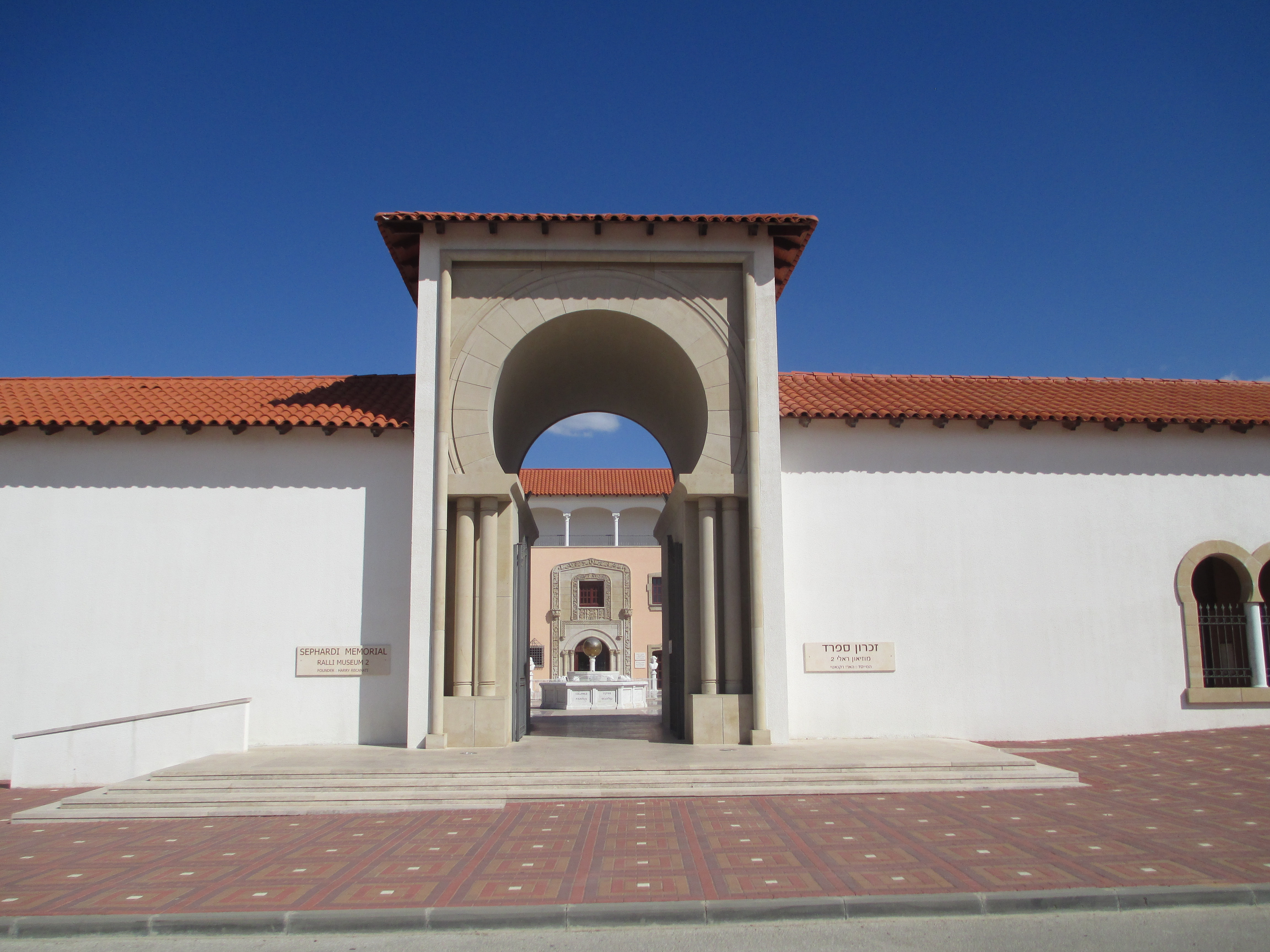
Ralli 2 Entrance

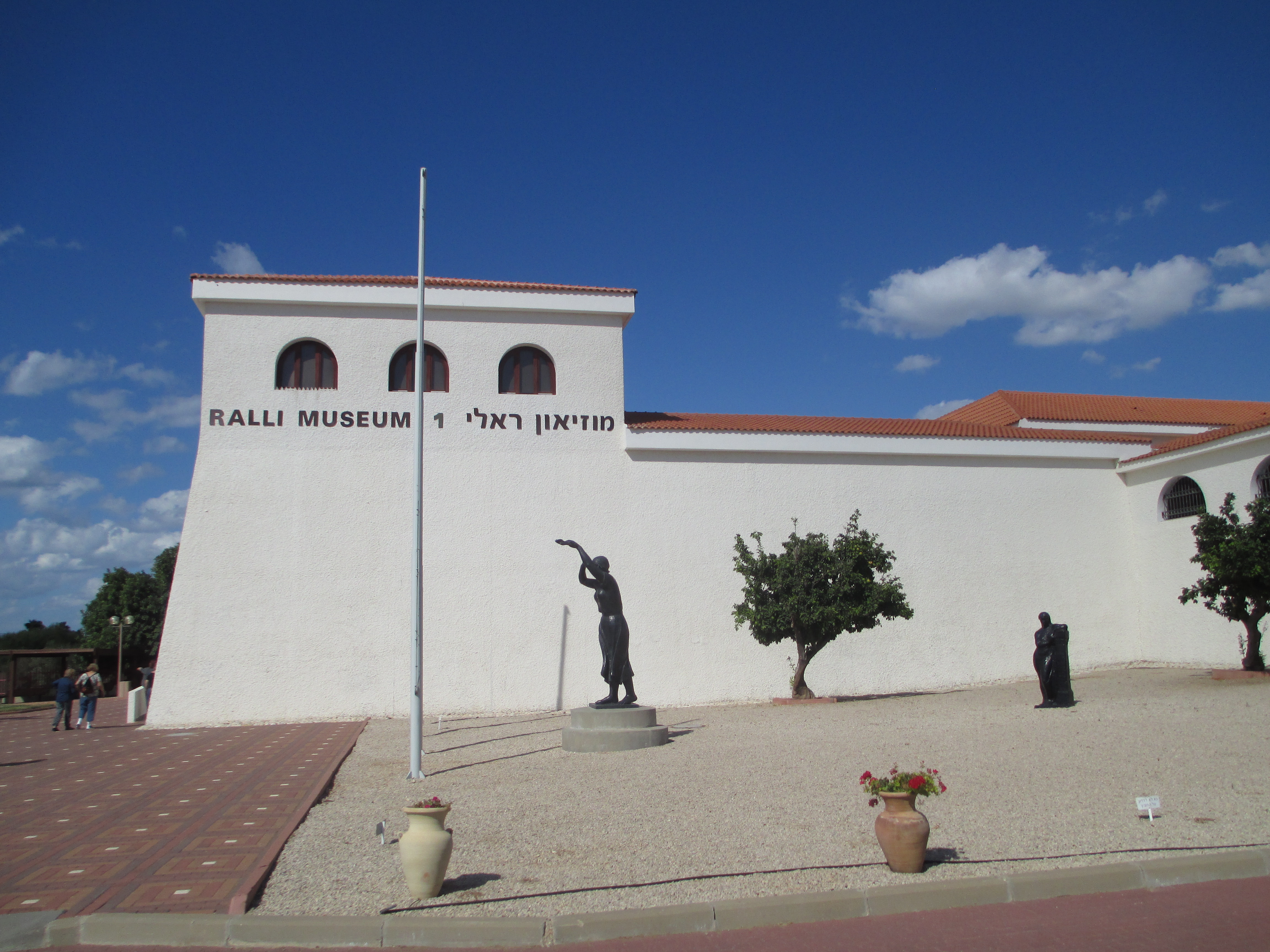
Ralli Museum

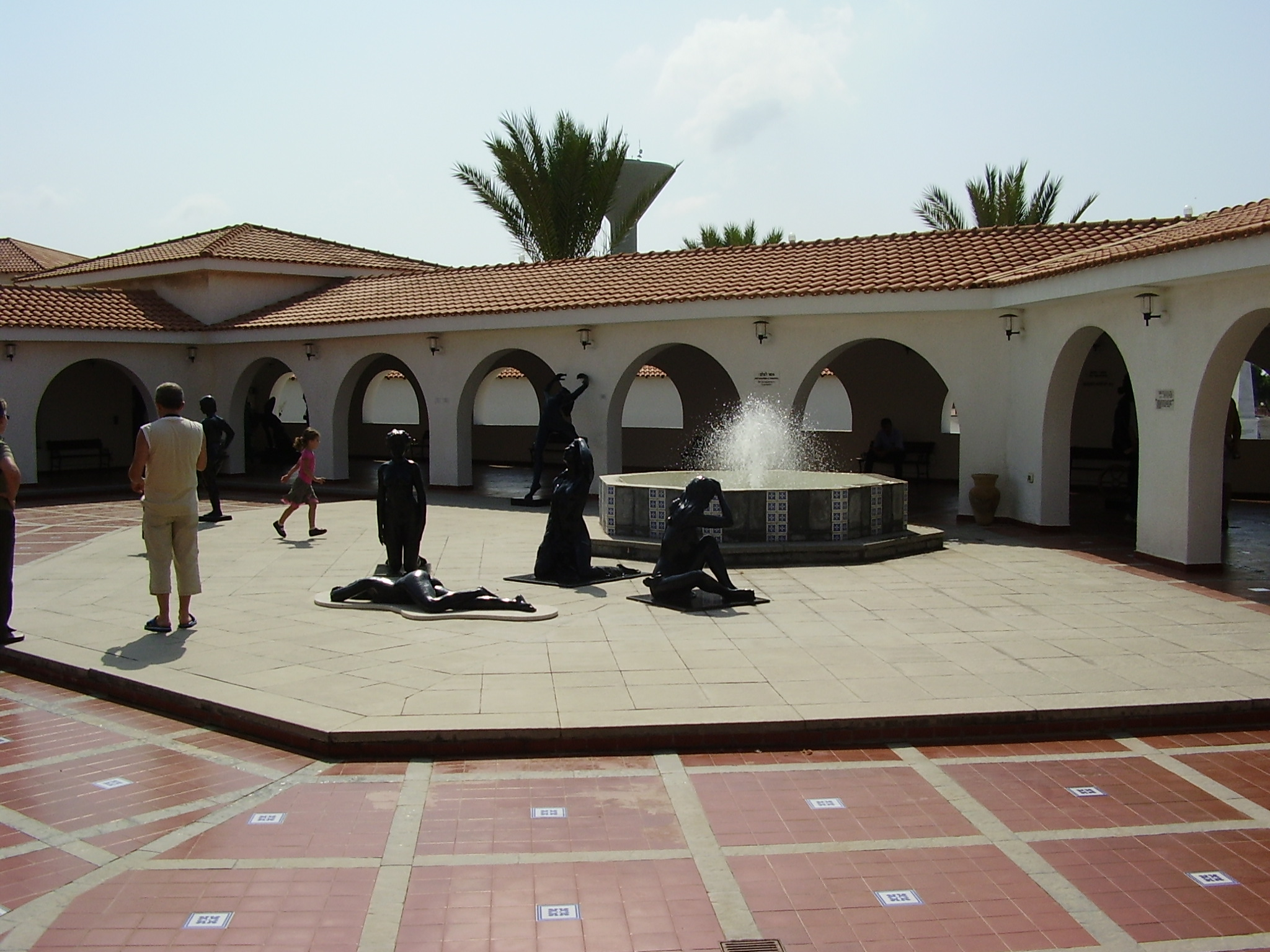
Ralli 1 Courtyard

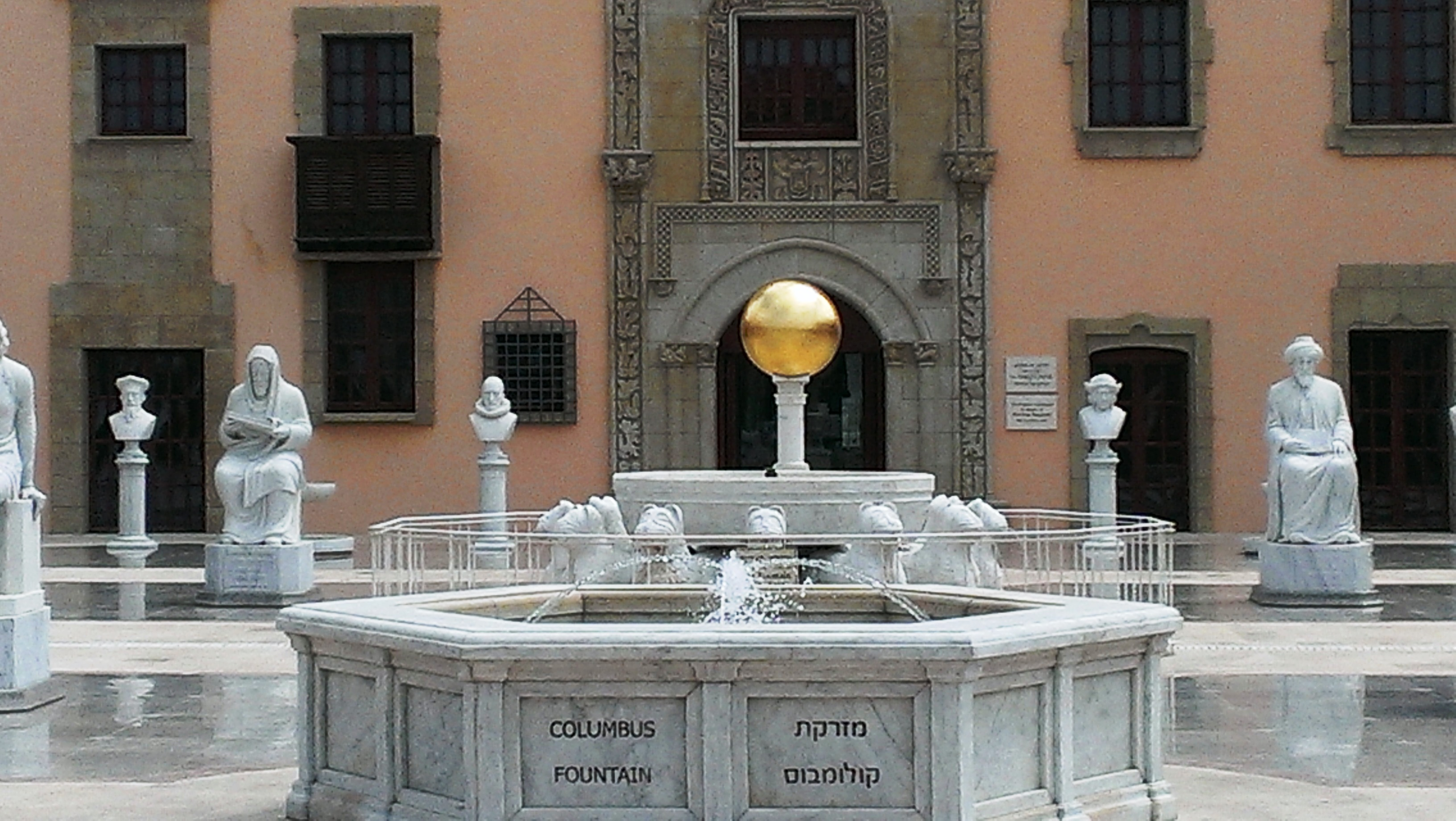
Ralli Museum

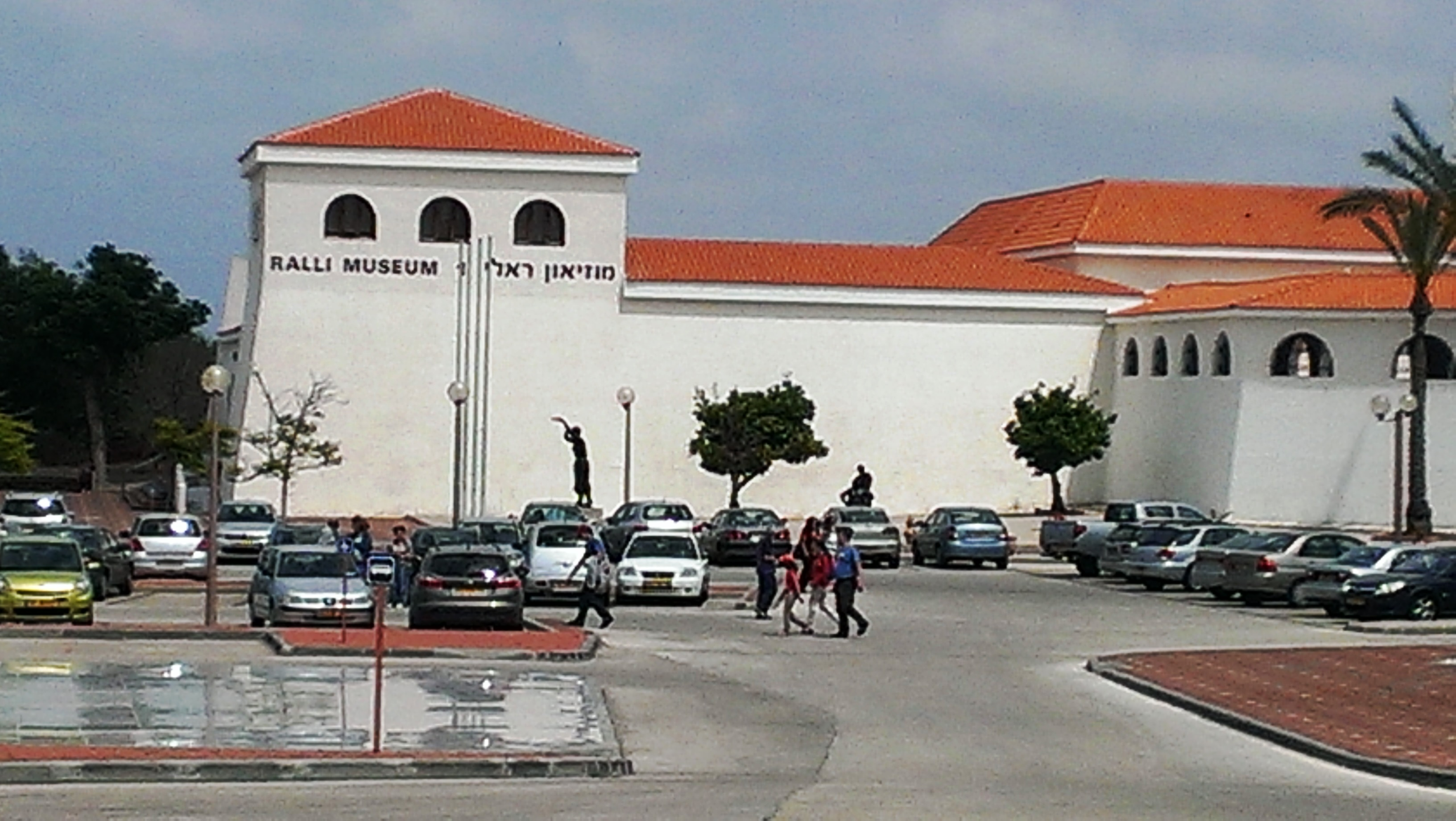
Ralli Museum

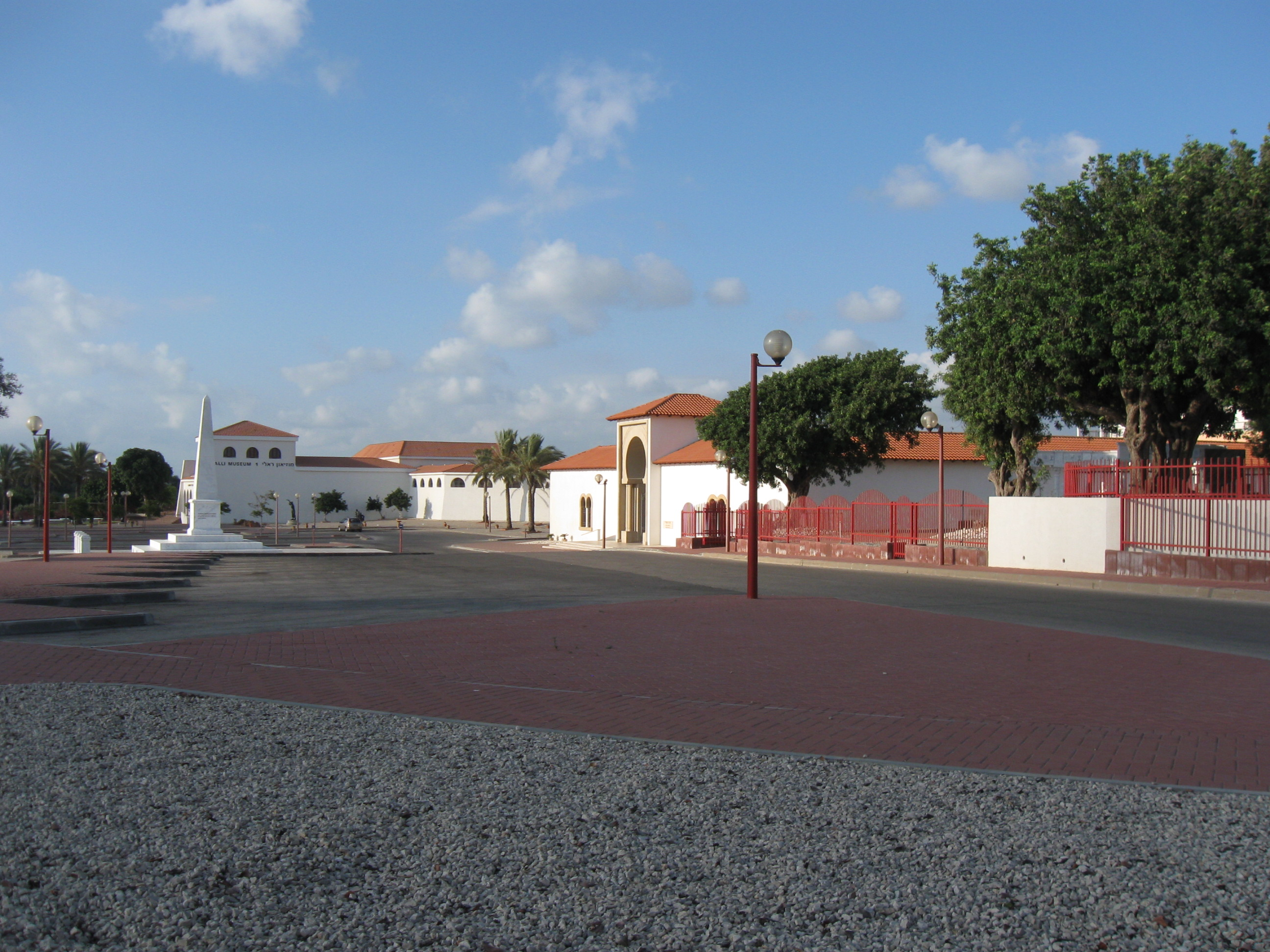
Ralli Museum

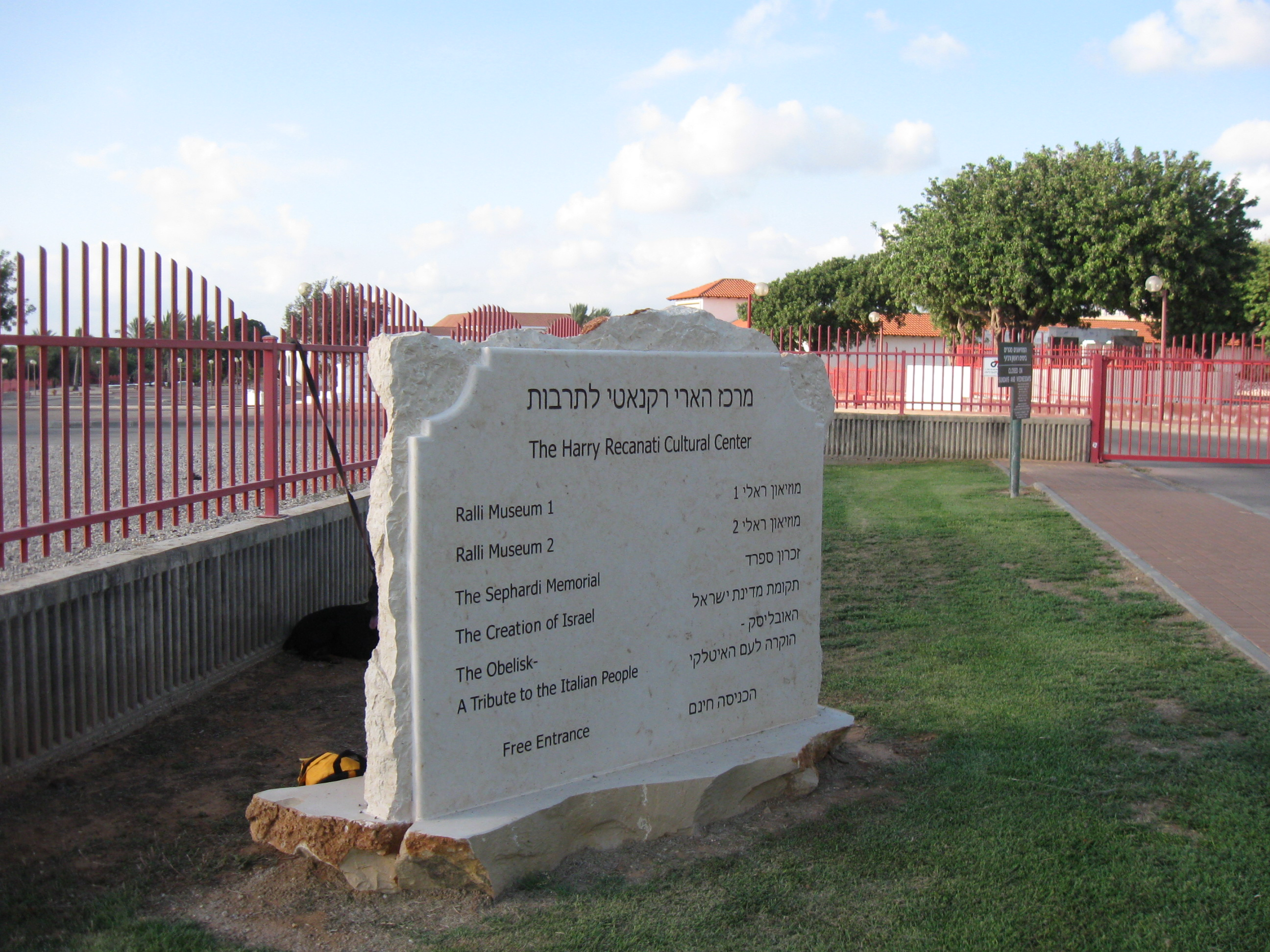
Ralli Museum Entrance

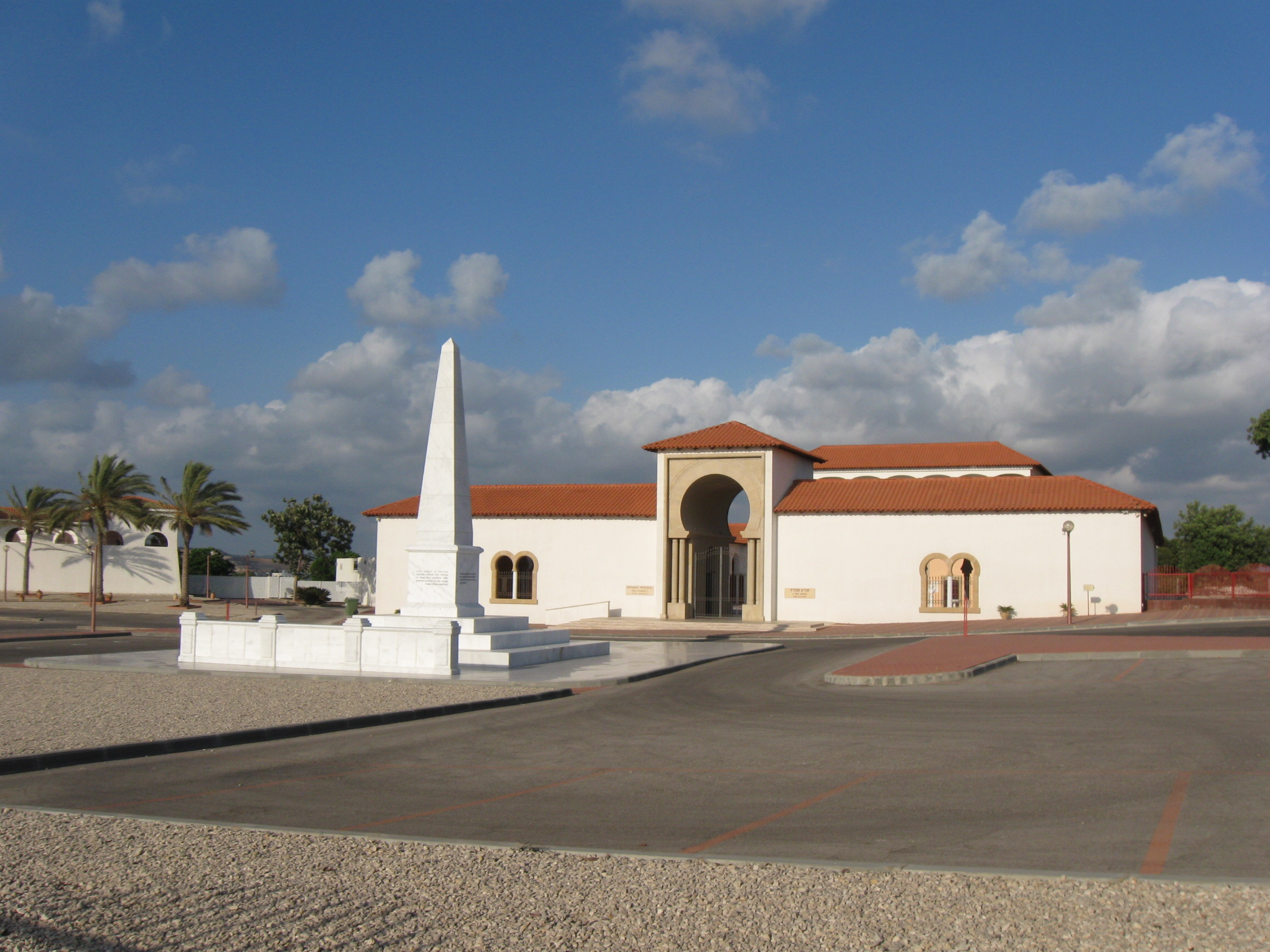
Ralli Museum

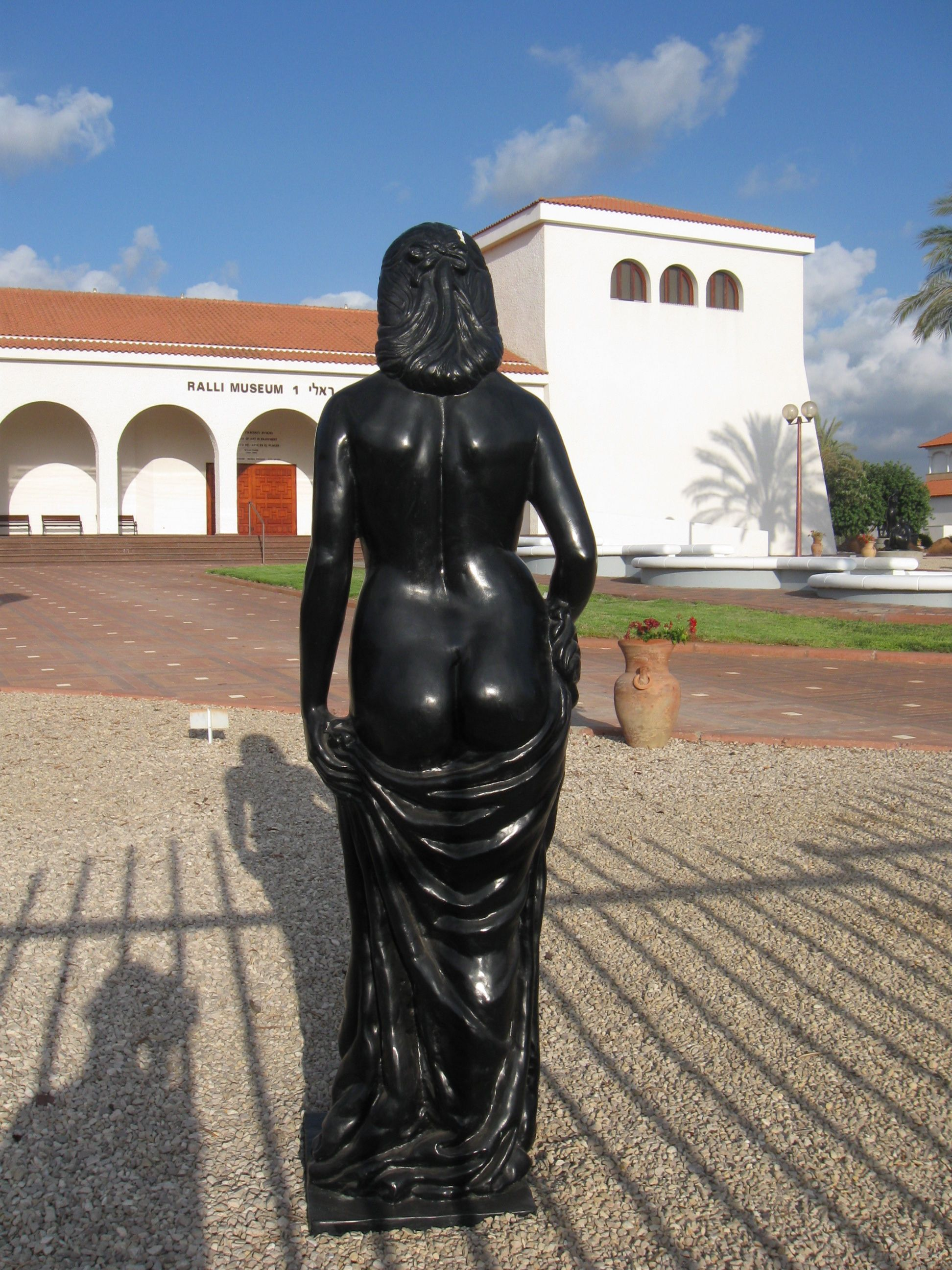
Ralli Museum
