= Jose Maria Morelos Buenavista =

Coordinates: 19.5703°N 98.2703°W

José Maria Morelos Buenavista Buenavista
- Locality
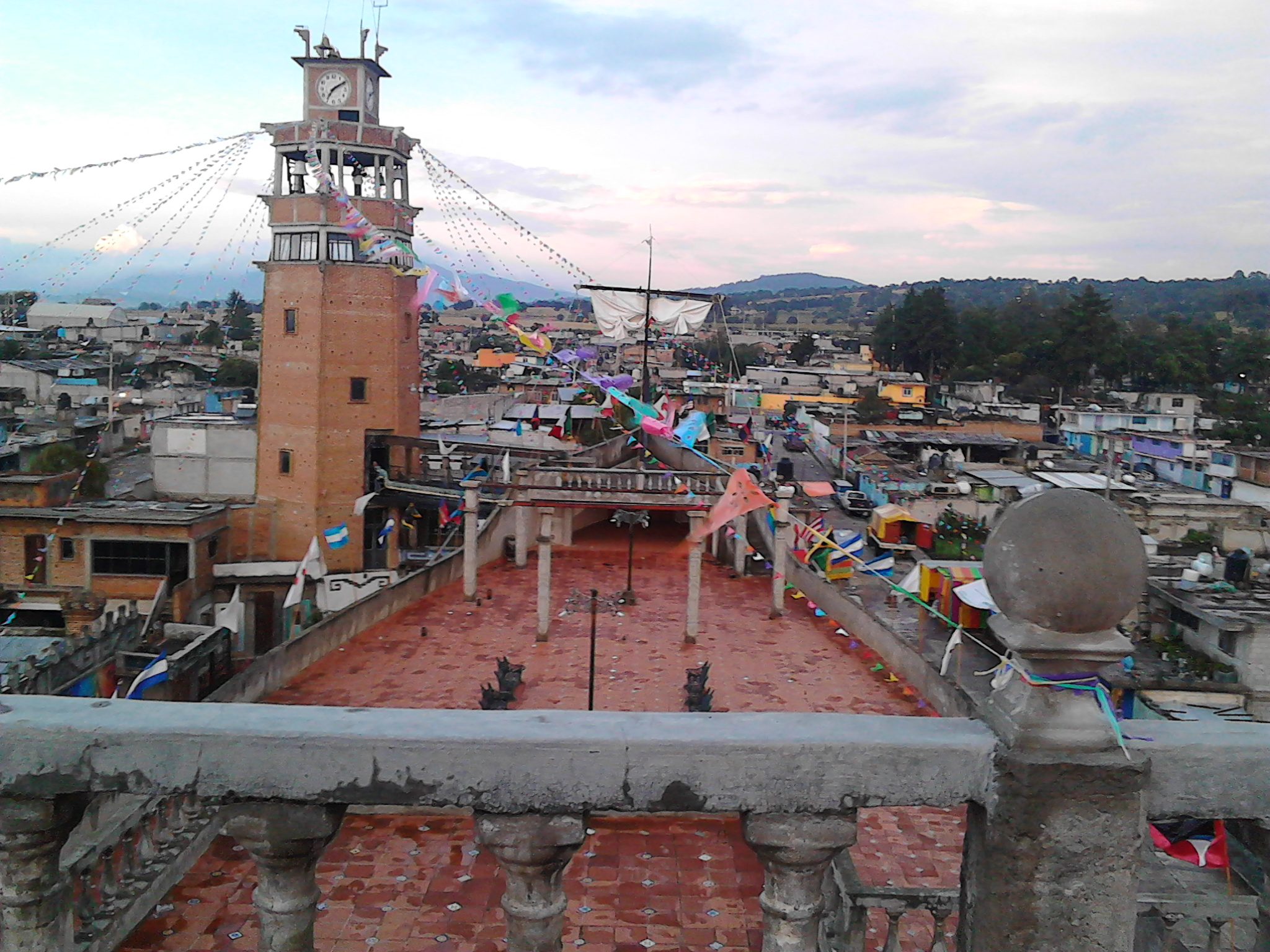
- Motto(s): "Cuando la fe florece, se convierte en obras"
- Interactive map of José Maria Morelos Buenavista
- Country: Mexico
- State: Tlaxcala
- Municipality: Tlaxco
- Founder: Emilio Corona

Population (2010 Census)
  - Total: 1,762
- Demonym: Buenavistense
- Time zone: UTC -6
- Postal code: 90250

José María Morelos Buenavista or simply called Buenavista, is a town situated in the northwest of the State of Tlaxcala in the Mexican Republic, located in the municipality of Tlaxco. According to the INEGI in the census of the 2010 its population was 1,762 inhabitants. Its main economic activities are agriculture and cattle herding.

== Prominent Figures ==
- Hermenegildo Sosa
- Alvaro Cortes
- Arnulfo Mejía Rojas
