= Maximiliano Alaníz =

Argentine footballer (born 1990)

Personal information
- Full name: Maximiliano Manuel Alaníz Moreno
- Date of birth: 1 May 1990 (age 36)
- Place of birth: Mendoza, Argentina
- Height: 1.78 m (5 ft 10 in)
- Position: Forward

Senior career*
Years	Team	Apps	(Gls)
2008–2010	Godoy Cruz	2	(0)
2010–2012	Huracán	46	(17)
2012–2013	Magallanes	25	(5)
2013–2014	Puerto Montt	15	(6)
2014–2015	Deportes Valdivia	30	(19)
2015–2016	San Antonio Unido	21	(5)
2017	Luján de Cuyo	18	(2)
2019	FADEP	2	(1)
Total		159	(55)
- * Club domestic league appearances and goals as of 31 July 2021

Maximiliano Manuel Alaníz Moreno (born 1 May 1990) is a retired Argentine footballer who played as a forward.
