= Vladimir Cora =

Mexican sculptor and painter

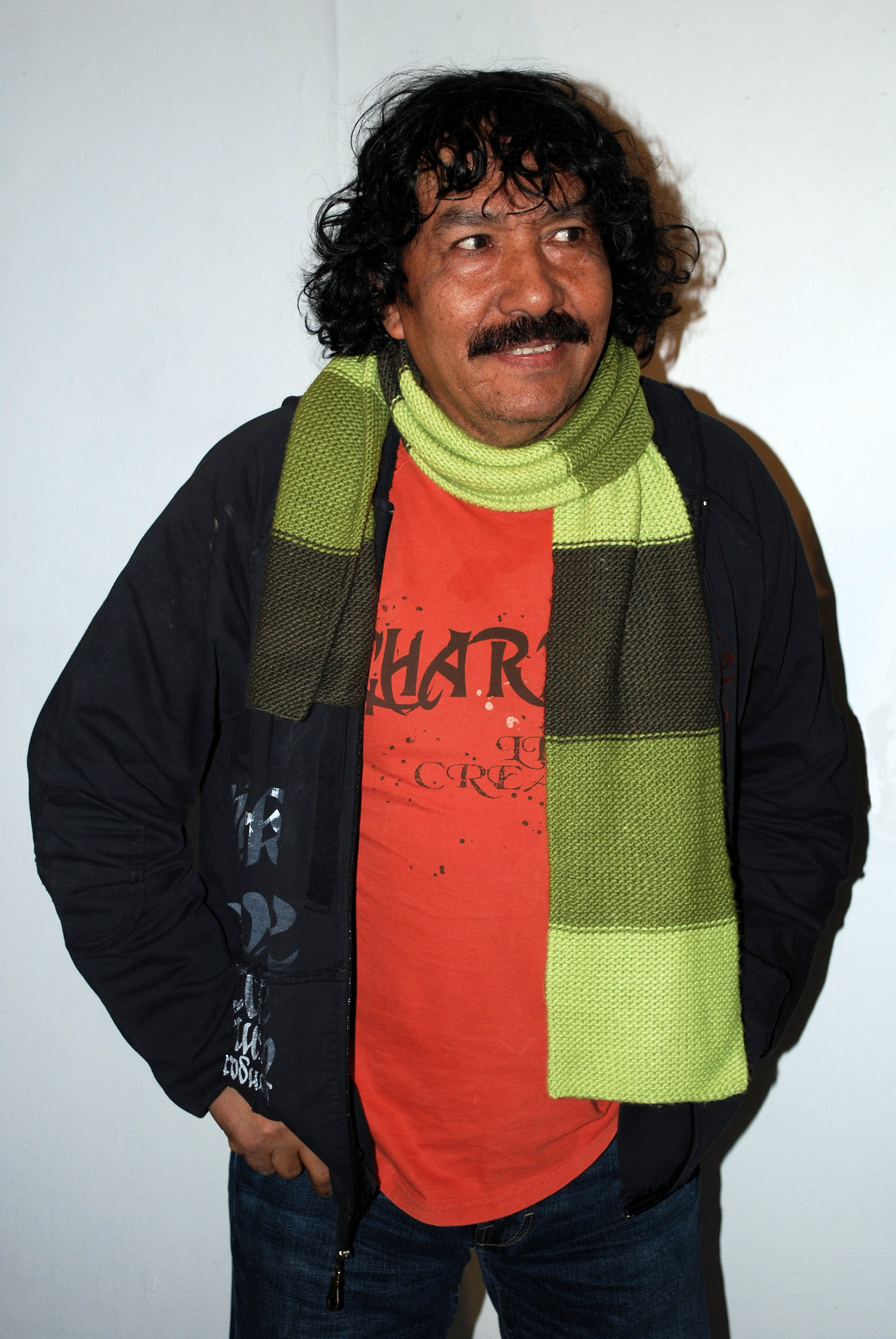
Vladimir Cora at the Salón de la Plastica Mexicana

Vladimir Cora (born 1951, Acaponeta, Nayarit) is a Mexican painter and sculptor based in the state of Nayarit, whose work has been recognized by various awards and membership in the Salón de la Plástica Mexicana. He discovered art at age fifteen, after deciding that he could not be a musician. He received training in Tijuana and Mexico City, with his first success in the 1980s. His style has been described as neo-figurative, minimalist and coarse, and he creates his works in series usually related to the apostles, flowers, birds and women, especially those related to Nayarit. He has had over 150 individual exhibitions both in Mexico and abroad and continues to work from his home state.

== Life ==
Vladimir Cora was born in San Diego el Naranjo in the municipality of Acaponeta, Nayarit. His father named him after Vladimir Lenin, and his last name is derived from that of the Cora people who are native to his home state.

He played with lace, white paper and paintbrushes as a child, but did not discover art until he was a teenager. At age fourteen, he wanted to be a musician, inspired by Carlos Santana, but says that he had to give it up for “…having clumsy hands.” He discovered art at age fifteen, working as a delivery boy for his aunt's pharmacy in Mazatlán. There he came across a magazine cover with a reproduction of a Monet painting. He took some classes and began by reproducing images he saw in publications.

He stated that when he discovered art, he decided that it was what he was born for. Frustrated with his progress, he decided to run off to Mexico City and he remembers his first time seeing the Palacio de Bellas Artes. Struggling to survive and learn art, he was in the city only six months before he hitchhiked his way to Tijuana. There he also had problems finding shelter until someone gave him room and board in exchange for some of his drawings, but he did manage to attend some classes. After Tijuana, he returned to Mazatlán where he met with family disapproval but he says he never regretted it. Later, he entered the Escuela Nacional de Pintura, Escultura y Grabado "La Esmeralda" but only stayed for a year and a half. There he met Gabriel Macotela, who introduced him to Gilberto Aceves Navarro. He also worked in Rufino Tamayo’s studio and learned various techniques that he used in his own work, but says he never tried to imitate his teacher's work.

Since beginning his career, he has mostly lived off his art, teaching classes as well in various places. When he works, he is in his studio from morning until night and often does not even go out to eat. He remains in his native Nayarit and has never considered living in Mexico City to further his career or fame. His routine is early, getting up at 6am to run, then drinking coffee to begin painting at 730. He considers himself reclusive and tends to shy away from social events. However, he does value connections with other artists and sharing ideas with them. When he is not painting he enjoys his aviary where he has a number of parrot and macaw species.

He has defined himself as a romantic who should have been born in the 18th century. He met his wife in 1986 and they eloped. They were separated for three years, reunited in 1989 and shortly after his first daughter Adilene was born. They did not have the religious ceremony until 1999, with painter Manuel Felguérez and his wife Mercedes as witnesses. The couple has two other children, Vladimir and Lica. He does not like to fly and prefers to travel by automobile when he has to travel.

== Career ==
Cora has had over 150 individual exhibitions and has participated in many more collective ones. He had his very first exhibition in 1974 in Nayarit. He began to be able to live off his art around 1981, when he had an exhibition in Puerto Vallarta, where all thirty three pieces sold in one night. He used the money to buy a car. In 1982 he entered two pieces at the first Rufino Tamayo biennale in Oaxaca. One received a prize which allowed him to meet the famous Oaxacan painter. Since then he has had his work exhibited in a wide variety of galleries and cultural centers in Mexico such as the Museo Regional de Nayarit, the Instituto Regional de Bellas Ares in Mazatlan, the Ex-Convento del Carmen in Guadalajara, the Museo de Arte Moderno in Culiacán and the Galería HB in Mexico City. In 2004, he created a series of pieces such as paintings, graphic work and sculpture with fellow Mexican artist Jazzamoart and exhibited them. The series Los Apóstoles was on display in front of the Palacio de Bellas Artes in 2010. In 2013, he exhibited a series called “Reminiscencias” at the Salón de la Plástica Mexicana, of which he is a member. Outside of Mexico he has had exhibitions in Palm Springs, CA, Havana, Lima and Miami. He exhibited at the Kodak Gallery in the SoHo section of New York in 2008.

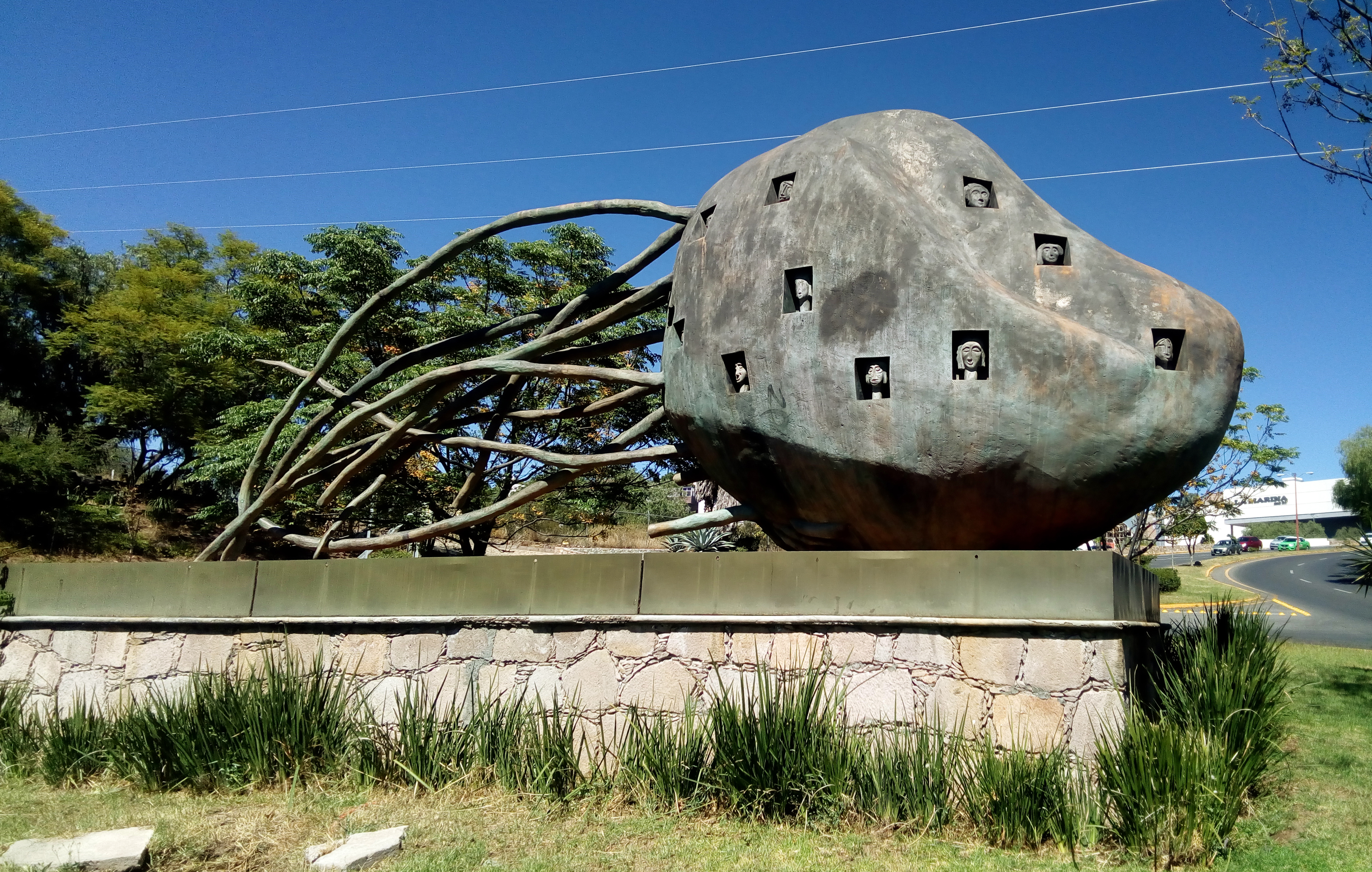
The Biggest Heart On Earth.

Cora has spent most of his professional life working from his native Nayarit, rather than in Mexico City like most Mexican artists although he has a workshop in California. Much of his work has a relationship to this state, such as Danza de pájaros (Bird Dance) painted for the International Festival of Migratory Birds in San Blas. For this series, he built a cabin on the Palmar de Cuautla beach to observe the birds there.

In 2010, Cora donated a work called The Biggest Heart On Earth to the city of Guanajuato and the Festival Internacional Cervantino. The piece was vandalized with graffiti and the removal of several parts. The bronze sculpture is in the shape of a human heart, which represents Nayarit, with twenty niches that represent the state’s twenty municipalities. The piece was taken out of Guanajuato because the city could not guarantee its security.

He received an honorary mention at the first Rufino Tamayo Biennal, the Gran Premio de Confraternidad de Cuatro Cultural at the first Iberoamerican Painting Biennal of the Instituto Andino de Artes Populares in Miami and the Fine Arts Prize of the government of Nayarit.

== Artistry ==
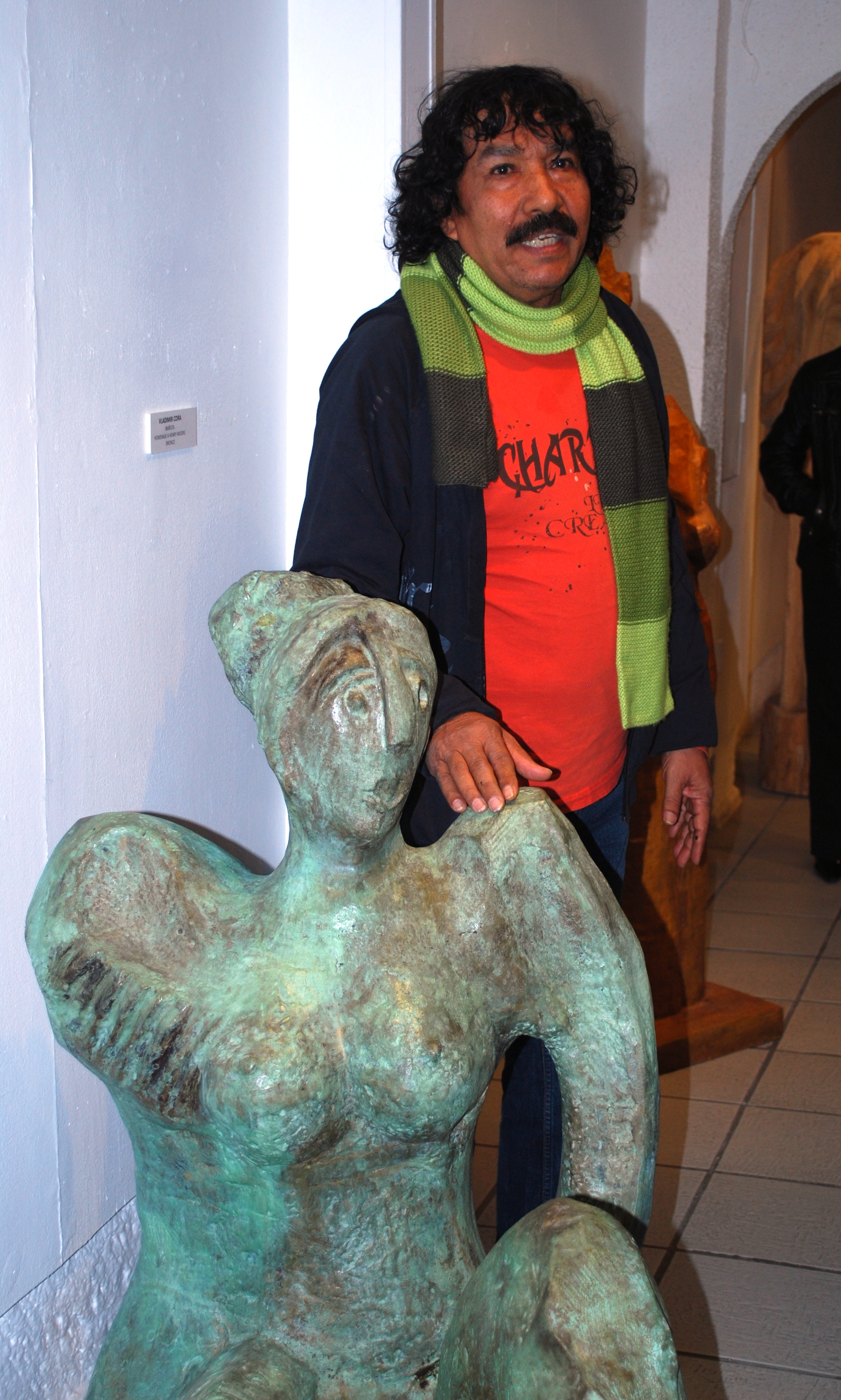
Cora with one of his sculptures at a 2013 exhibition

Cora is a painter and a sculptor. He began painting with oils on canvas and then began to work with acrylics and enamels. Today he mixes the mediums, for example enamels over previously painted oil and sometimes adding texture and volume to paintings, but prefers acrylics because they dry faster. His paintings are medium-sized but some are large, and his work, especially the addition of enamel, has been described by Mexican art critic Teresa del Conde as giving a Northern Mexican or Chicano look. Later he began sculpting, starting with wood, then plaster and bronze. His sculptures tend to be either small scale with a popular art character or sculptures of medium or large size. Many of his sculptures are made by modifying natural formations such as tree roots or twisted tree trunks. His bronze works show influence from Alberto Castro Leñero, which whom he has worked.

Much of his work is classified as neo-figurative. His work has been described as a “… skillful exercise of composition and color, of the transformation of color to a primordial form…” He often paints without sketching first once he has a theme as he likes to be spontaneous. Cora believes that art should relate to “ancestral memory” and old myths applied to modern reality. His development as an artist has not experienced serious changes in direction or jumps from one style to another. He has maintained a consistent identity, using rich colors in a minimalist style. His painting technique is not sophisticated or elegant but rather expressionist, coarse and spontaneous. His use of light and color shows influence from Rufino Tamayo. Northern Mexican influence in his work comes from classes in Tijuana as well as exhibitions and work done in Laguna Beach and other cities in California.

Almost all of his work is done in series, based on a theme. Recurring themes in his work are the Twelve Apostles, flowers, fruit, birds and female nudes. His depictions of women are often related to the concepts of desire and devotion, often with the body partially hidden to give a sense of looking into a private scene. When the woman is completely shown, she often assumes monumental proportions with solid anatomy. Female themes have included a series on “Señorita Tecuala,” a stereotype of tropical women from Nayarit and his wife, who was the inspiration for the series, “Natura: Flores para Mary” which was exhibited at the José Luis Cuevas Museum . His more recent work often gives the sense of looking at a private moment.

== Casa Museo Vladimir Cora ==
The Casa Museo Vladimir Cora was founded by the artist in 1999. It contains a collection of his works from the 1980s to the present as well as pieces from the Castro Leñero brothers, Rufino Tamayo, Francisco Toledo, Sebastián, Manuel Felguérez, Vicente Rojo and Gabriel Macotela. It also holds between two and four temporary exhibitions each year in paintings, graphic work and sculpture. The building dates from the 19th century.
