= Maximov =

Maximov or Maksimov or Maximoff (Russian: Максимов) is a Russian surname. Transliterated from Ukrainian, it may be rendered as Maksymov. The feminine forms are Maximova, Maksimova and Maksymova. The surname is derived from the male given name Maksim and literally means Maksim's. It may refer to:

- Aleksandr Maksimov (ethnographer) (1872–1941), Soviet ethnographer
- Aleksey Mikhailovich Maksimov (1813–1861), Russian stage actor
- Aleksey Aleksandrovich Maksimov (born 1952), Russian painter and enamellist
- Alexander A. Maximow (1874–1928), Russian scientist
- Dmitry Maksimov (judoka) (born 1978), Russian judoka
- Dmitry Maksimov (runner) (born 1977), Russian runner
- Ekaterina Maximova (1939–2009), Soviet and Russian ballerina
- Elena Maksimova (born 1988), Belarusian chess master
- Grigorii Maksimov (1893–1950), Russian anarcho-syndicalist
- Ilya Maksimov (born 1987), Russian footballer
- Ivan Maksimov (born 1995), Russian footballer
- Ivan Maximov (born 1958), Russian animator
- Larisa Maksimova (1943–2025), Russian mathematical logician
- Matéo Maximoff (1917–1999), French writer
- Nikolai Maksimov (born 1956), Russian naval officer
- Nikolay Maksimov (born 1972), Russian water polo player
- Nikolai Alexandrovich Maximov (1880–1952), Soviet plant physiologist
- Nina Christesen (née Maximoff; 1911–2001), Russian-Australian academic
- Oleksandr Maksymov (born 1986), Ukrainian footballer
- Sergey Maksimov (1831–1901), Russian ethnographic writer
- Valentina Maksimova (born 1937), Russian track cyclist
- Vassily Maximov (1844–1911), 19th-century Russian painter
- Vladimir Maksimov (actor) (1880–1937), Russian actor
- Vladimir Maksimov (writer) (1930–1995), Soviet and Russian writer
- Vladimir Maksimov (born 1945), Soviet and Russian handball player and coach
- Yevgeny Maximov (1849–1904), Russian soldier and journalist

== Fictional characters ==
- Demitri Maximoff, protagonist of the video game franchise Darkstalkers by Capcom
- Peter Maximoff, an X-Men film series superhero
- Pietro Maximoff, also known as Quicksilver, a Marvel Comics superhero
- Thomas Maximoff, also known as Tommy Shepherd or Speed, a Marvel Comics superhero
- Crystalia Amaquelin Maximoff, also known as Crystal, a Marvel Comics superhero and Quicksilver's ex-wife
- Luna Maximoff, a Marvel Comics superhero and daughter of Quicksilver and Crystal
- Wanda Maximoff, also known as the Scarlet Witch, a Marvel Comics superhero and mother of Wiccan and Speed
- William Maximoff, also known as Billy Kaplan-Altman or Wiccan, a Marvel Comics superhero

== See also ==
- Maksymowicz
- Maksimović
- Maksimenko
