= Maksymenko =

Maksymenko or Maksimenko is a Ukrainian-language surname derived from the first name Maksym (Maxim).

The surname may refer to:

- Alina Maksymenko (born 1991), Ukrainian gymnast
- Andrei Maksimenko (born 1969), Ukrainian chess grandmaster
- Anna Maksymenko
- Ihor Maksymenko (born 1984), Ukrainian martial artist
- Ivan Maksymenko
- Maksym Maksymenko (born 1990), Ukrainian footballer
- Serhiy Maksymenko (1941–2025), Ukrainian psychologist
- Vitālijs Maksimenko (born 1990), Latvian footballer
- Yuriy Maksymenko

== See also ==
- Maksymowicz
- Maksimović
- Maximov
