= Patriarch Maxim =

Patriarch Maxim or Patriarch Maksim may refer to:

- Bulgarian Patriarch Maxim, Archbishop of Trnovo and Bulgarian Patriarch from 1971 to 2012
- Serbian Patriarch Maxim, Archbishop of Peć and Serbian Patriarch from 1655 to 1680

== See also ==
- Patriarch (disambiguation)
- Maxim (disambiguation)
- Maxim (given name)
- List of Patriarchs of the Bulgarian Orthodox Church
- List of heads of the Serbian Orthodox Church
