= Patriarch Maximus IV =

Patriarch Maximus IV or Patriarch Maximos IV may refer to:

- Maximus IV of Constantinople, Ecumenical Patriarch in 1491–1497
- Maximos IV Sayegh, patriarch of the Melkite Greek Catholic Church in 1948–1967

== See also ==
- Patriarch (disambiguation)
- Maximus (disambiguation)
