= Patriarch Maximus II =

Patriarch Maximus II or Patriarch Maximos II may refer to:

- Maximus II of Antioch, Patriarch in 449–455
- Maximus II of Constantinople, Ecumenical Patriarch in 1216
- Maximos II Hakim, Patriarch of the Melkite Greek Catholic Church in 1760–1761

== See also ==
- Patriarch (disambiguation)
- Maximus (disambiguation)
- Patriarch Maximus I (disambiguation)
