= Maximalism (disambiguation) =

Maximalism is an art movement.

Maximalism may also refer to:

- Maximum programme, a series of demands aiming to achieve socialism
- Revisionist Maximalism, a Jewish fascist ideology
- Biblical maximalism, a movement in biblical scholarship
- Maximalism (album), a 2016 studio album by Amaranthe
- The Union of Socialists-Revolutionaries-Maximalists, a splinter faction of the Russian Socialist-Revolutionary party

== See also ==
- Maximal (disambiguation)
- Maxima (disambiguation)
- Maxim (disambiguation)
- Maxi (disambiguation)
- Max (disambiguation)
