= Patriarch Maximus III =

Patriarch Maximus III or Patriarch Maximos III may refer to:

- Maximus III of Constantinople, Ecumenical Patriarch in 1476–1482
- Maximos III Mazloum, patriarch of the Melkite Greek Catholic Church in 1833–1855

== See also ==
- Patriarch (disambiguation)
- Maximus (disambiguation)
