= Patriarch Maximus V =

Patriarch Maximus V or Patriarch Maximos V may refer to:

- Maximus V of Constantinople, Ecumenical Patriarch in 1946–1948
- Maximos V Hakim, Melkite Greek Catholic Patriarch in 1967–2000

== See also ==
- Patriarch (disambiguation)
- Maximus (disambiguation)
