= Lufia: The Legend Returns =

2001 video game

- North American box art
- Developer: Neverland
- Publishers: JP: Taito; NA: Natsume Inc.; EU: Ubi Soft
- Director: Masahide Miyata
- Designer: Tomonari Matsumoto
- Writer: Masahide Miyata
- Composers: Yasunori Shiono; Akiko Ishibashi; Tomoko Morita; Yukio Nakajima
- Platform: Game Boy Color
- Release: JP: September 7, 2001; NA: September 20, 2001; EU: October 23, 2001
- Genre: Role-playing
- Mode: Single-player

Lufia: The Legend Returns (Note: Known as Estpolis Denki: Yomigaeru Densetsu in Japan) is a role-playing video game for the Game Boy Color developed by Neverland and published by Taito, Natsume Inc., and Ubi Soft in Japan, North America, and Europe, respectively, in 2001. It is the third game in the Lufia series and the first one to appear on a handheld gaming system.

== Gameplay ==
Lufia: The Legend Returns is similar to other games in the series, with role-playing video game elements like random battles. It uses the series' "IP System": special skills are not tied to character equipment. Instead, characters gain new special abilities (called "IP Skills"), by finding Ancient Texts hidden within various dungeons throughout the game. To use those abilities, they must obtain the requisite amount of Spiritual Force (or "SF").

Much of the game takes place on the Battle Screen, where the player's characters will engage enemies ranging from low-level Red Jellies to sea creatures and evil gods. Even though nine characters can take part in a battle, only three of them may attack per turn, one per vertical column. Characters in the top row will do more damage when attacking enemies, but will also receive more damage; those in the back row will receive less damage, but also deal less. In order to make the most of these three turns, the player is able to move the characters around the Battle Screen in between rounds. In this way, it is possible to revolve characters around the field in order to make the most of their different abilities. If a character loses all of his or her HP during a battle, that character will be unable to participate in the rest of the battle, and will not earn any Experience or Learning Points once the battle is over. The character will automatically be revived after the battle with 1 point of HP, but if the player revives the character before the battle ends, there will be no penalty. A new addition to this third installment in the Lufia series is the Spiritual Force, which comes in four types, and lets the character learn one IP skill. The Ancient Cave, made popular in Lufia II: Rise of the Sinistrals, reappears in this third installment in the series. As in the original, the Ancient Cave's layout is randomly generated and consists of 200 distinct levels that the player must navigate in order to reach the bottom.

Lufia: The Legend Returns contains a large overworld map through which the player must travel in order to advance the game's plot. There are usually no enemies found within the cities scattered around the world, but the overworld and the caves that separate the different regions of the continents are full of them. The quests that are found on each continent are based on the four Towers and the Sinistral that is located in each one. On Epsis Continent, players try to repair the destruction caused by Gades. On Lidel, players uncover the mystery surrounding the chaotic Alstadt Kingdom. On Fante, many supporting characters are made to feel intense fear at the hands of Daos, Sinistral of Terror, and it is up to players to quell the confusion.

== Plot ==
Lufia: The Legend Returns takes places one hundred years after the events of Lufia & the Fortress of Doom and two hundred years after the events of Lufia II: Rise of the Sinistrals. The game begins by outlining the "Doom Island Wars" (the events of the first two Lufia games) and goes on to explain how four all-powerful beings known as the Sinistrals were defeated by a hero named Maxim and his three companions two hundred years ago, and then again by his descendant one hundred years ago.

This game follows the trials and tribulations of a teenager named Wain, who is actually a descendant of Maxim himself. When a mysterious woman arrives in his village one day looking for a "swordsman", she runs into Wain on the street and asks if he is any good as a fighter. Unconvinced that Wain is the best that the village has to offer, the woman sends him away, and Wain goes outside the village to vent his anger on unsuspecting monsters.

After the player moves back into the city, the camera pans out, and an unknown force appears at the nearby Tower of Death, immediately burning down a house in the city. Several uncontrollable scenes ensue, during which Wain rescues a girl from the burning house, collapses from smoke-inhalation, and is nursed back to health by the woman, who introduces herself as Seena, a famous fortune teller from another continent who is on a "Great Adventure". Seena convinces Wain to go with her on her fated journey, and the player sets out to see who or what is causing trouble at the tower. When the two finally reach the top, they come face to face with Gades, one of the four Sinistrals who threatened the world many years ago. Though Wain and Seena are inevitably defeated and Gades escapes, their mission is clear: it is up to them to gather strong fighters and stop the newly awakened Sinistrals to save the world from destruction.

In order to accomplish this task, Wain and Seena travel north to the city of Albano, where they meet Fugo, the richest man on the Epsis Continent. Fugo asks Wain and Seena to catch a local thief in return for a large reward, and the pair agrees to find him. After traveling to the nearby Slani Cave, the duo happens upon the thief, but he manages to escape after calling Wain "Stupid". Angry and confused, Wain decides to travel north to the rural town of Majari, the thief arrives to help dispatch a monster who attacked a young villager. The beast is later discovered to be one of Fugo's gold-eating pets; Fugo sent out his pet because it has a keen sense of smell for gold. After chastising the heroes for not knowing the special value that a gold-eating pet can have, Fugo grabs the thief and the stolen gold and returns to Albano.

Seena and Wain then travel back to the city and speak with Fugo's daughter Melissa, who gives them a hint as to where Fugo is keeping the thief locked up. The pair then goes deep below Fugo's mansion to save the thief, who finally introduces himself as Dei, "Master Treasure Hunter". The trio escapes from the dungeon, only to find that Gades has reappeared and destroyed Fugo's partially built summer home. The player then engages in another battle with the Sinistral of Destruction. Again, regardless of whether the player defeats the boss, the story continues as if the characters lost, and Gades disappears again. Fugo retreats back into his first mansion, leaving Dei to travel with Wain and Seena.

The player then travels further north to the port city of Siantao, where they happen upon a pair of bandits robbing a young girl. The characters are about to intervene when a mysterious woman named Aima appears and scares off the thieves. Moments later, a local man announces that Leong Temple, the center of the Jigen-Ryu fighting style practiced by Aima, was destroyed by the Garland Gang, a sinister group of bandits who has holed up to the west of Siantao. Aima rushes to the temple, and the player finds that Aima's fighting master has been kidnapped. The group convinces Aima that they need to work together to rescue him, and they travel to the Garland Gang's hideout. After traveling to the basement of their lair and defeating the leader, the Garland Gang disbands, and Aima is able to return her master to Siantao.

On returning to Siantao, the player discovers that Gades has descended and razed the entire city. Aima's master attempts to defeat the Sinistral, but is too old to dispatch him, and eventually dies after leaving the secret skill of the Jigen-Ryu to Aima, making her the new master of the discipline. Aima and the rest of the group resolve once more to defeat Gades, and return to the top of the Tower of Death. This time, the plot will not continue if the player loses to Gades, but the characters are strong enough to defeat him without too much trouble. After defeating the Sinistral of Destruction, Seena reveals that he is only one of four Sinistrals who have appeared in the world and that he is the weakest of the group.

== Development ==
There were several characters initially created to be part of the cast of Lufia: The Legend Returns who were not put into the final version of the story. These characters included Chelsee, a girl who dreams of becoming a teen idol, Bareia, a self-aggrandizing half-vampire, and Panapas, a precocious artist not unlike Relm Arrowny from Final Fantasy VI.

=== Lufia: Ruins Chaser ===
When Lufia: The Legend Returns was in development, it was originally going to be a PlayStation title called Lufia III: Ruins Chaser (also written without the "III" as simply Lufia: Ruins Chaser). The game was revealed to U.S. publications under this name, and it was assumed it would be released sometime in late 2000 or early 2001, but the company working on it, Nihon-Flex went out of business during its production, and the project was scrapped. A short time later, the game was picked up by long-time Lufia series developer Neverland and after a process of significant downgrading of the graphics while at the same time completely rewriting the story and creating new characters, Lufia: The Legend Returns became the game it was released.

== Reception ==
Reception

Aggregate score
Aggregator	Score
GameRankings	61%

Review scores
Publication	Score
Famitsu	26/40
Nintendo Power	3 of 5
Nintendojo	6.8 of 10
RPGamer	4 of 10

Lufia: The Legend Returns received mixed critical reception on release, with the game's unique party system being praised, though the complexity of the menus was criticized.
