= Patriarch Maximus I =

Patriarch Maximus I or Patriarch Maximos I may refer to:

- Maximus I of Antioch, Archbishop of Antioch in 182–191
- Maximus I of Constantinople, Archbishop of Constantinople in 380

== See also ==
- Patriarch (disambiguation)
- Maximus (disambiguation)
- Patriarch Maximus II (disambiguation)
