= Maxim (given name) =

Maksim/Maxim/Maksym
- Gender: Epicene

Origin
- Origin: Latin maximus.
- Meaning: "The greatest" in Latin.
- Region of origin: Ancient Rome

Other names
- Related names: Max, Maximilian, Massimiliano, Maximus, Maksym, Maxime, Massimo

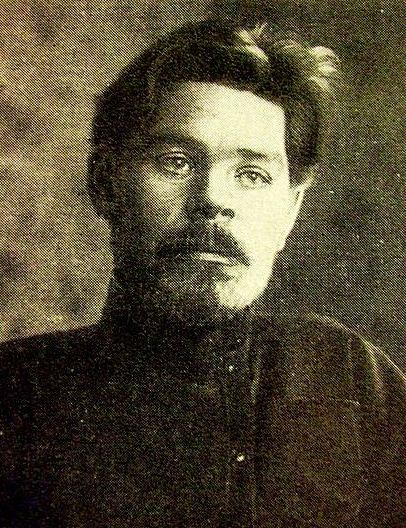
Maksim Gorkiy, aka Russian writer Alexei Maximovich Gorky (1868-1936)

Maxim (more accurately spelled Maksim assuming that "X" is not a consonant, but the conjunction of "K" and "S" sounds; "Maksym", or "Maxym") is an epicene (or gender-neutral) first name of Roman origin mainly given to males. It is adopted in Slavic-speaking countries such as Russia, Belarus, Bulgaria, Ukraine, Moldova, Kazakhstan, Serbia, Macedonia and Montenegro, as well as in countries which have maintained ties to the Soviet era. The name is derived from the Latin family name Maximus, meaning "the greatest".

It gave rise to a number of patronymic surnames: Maksymowicz, Maksimović, Maksymenko, Maximov. There is also a surname Maxim.

Notable people with the name include:

== Musicians ==
- Max Bemis, American musician and vocalist of Say Anything
- Maxim Berezovsky, Ukrainian composer and opera singer
- Maksim Dunayevsky, Russian film composer
- Maxim Fadeev, Russian singer-songwriter, composer and producer
- Maxim Galkin, Russian and Israeli comedian, television presenter and singer
- Maksim Mrvica, Croatian pianist
- Maxim (musician), English singer-songwriter and MC
- Maxim (artist), German singer
- Maxim Shostakovich, Russian and American conductor
- Maxim Vengerov, Russian violin virtuoso and conductor

== Politicians ==
- Maksim Konomi (born 1946), Albanian politician
- Maxim Litvinov, Russian revolutionary and diplomat
- Maksym Stepanov (born 1975), Ukrainian politician

== Sportspeople ==
- Can Maxim Mutaf (born 1991), Turkish-Russian basketball player
- Maxim Afinogenov, Russian ice hockey player
- Maksim Burchenko, Russian footballer
- Maksim Buznikin, Russian footballer
- Maksim Chmerkovskiy, Ukrainian ballroom dancer
- Maksim Devyatovskiy, Russian artistic gymnast
- Maksim "Max" Grechkin, Israeli footballer
- Maksym Kalynychenko, Ukrainian footballer
- Maksym Kowal (born 1991), Canadian soccer player
- Maxim Marinin, Russian pair skater
- Maxim Mrva (born 2007), Czech tennis player
- Maksym Murashkovskyi (born 2000), Ukrainian Paralympic Nordic skier
- Maxim Naumov (born 2001), American figure skater
- Maksim Podholjuzin (born 1992), Estonian footballer
- Maksim Romaschenko, Belarusian footballer
- Maxim Shabanov, Russian ice hockey player
- Maksim Shatskikh, Uzbek footballer
- Maxim Staviski, Russian-born Bulgarian world champion ice dancer
- Maksim Vashkevich (born 1999), Belarusian para swimmer
- Maksim Zhalmagambetov, Kazakh footballer

== Other ==
- Maksim Gelman, American murderer
- Maxim Gorky, Russian writer
- Maxim Kalashnikov, Russian writer and political activist
- Maksim Moshkow, public figure of the Russian Internet segment
- Maxim Sandovich (1888–1914), New Hieromartyr and Orthodox saint
- Max Stirner, German philosopher

== Fictional characters ==
- Maxim Kammerer, character in the Noon Universe series
- Maxim de Winter, the second Mrs. de Winter's name for her husband in Rebecca (novel) by Daphne du Maurier
- Maxim, the main hero of Lufia II: Rise of the Sinistrals
- Maxim Kischine, character from Castlevania: Harmony of Dissonance

== See also ==
- Maxim (disambiguation)
- Maxime, the equivalent name in French
- Massimo, the equivalent name in Italian
