= Maxim =

Maxim or Maksim may refer to:

== Entertainment ==
- Maxim (magazine), an international men's magazine
  - Maxim (Australia), the Australian edition
  - Maxim (India), the Indian edition
- Maxim Radio, Maxim magazine's radio channel on Sirius Satellite Radio
- Maxim, a fictional ship in the manga and anime series One Piece
- Maxim, the hero of the video game Lufia II: Rise of the Sinistrals and its remake, Lufia: Curse of the Sinistrals

== Literature and language ==
- A species of adage, aphorism, or saying that expresses a general moral rule, especially a philosophical maxim
- Maxims (Old English poems), examples of gnomic poetry
- Maximes (1665–78) of François de La Rochefoucauld (1613–80)

== Organizations ==
- Mary Maxim, craft and needlework mail-order company in Canada
- Maxim Brewery, brewing company in England
- Maxim's Catering, chain of caterers, restaurants, and fast food shops in Hong Kong
- Maxim Healthcare Services, medical staffing and home healthcare company
- Maxim Institute, public policy think tank in New Zealand
- Maxim Integrated, manufacturer of analog and mixed signal integrated circuits
- Maxim Motors, former manufacturer of firefighting apparatus located in Middleborough, Massachusetts
- Maxim's Paris, Parisian restaurant of the Belle Epoque
- Taxi Maxim, a Russian technology company

== People ==
- Maxim (given name)
- Maxim (surname)
- Maxim (musician)
- Maxim., taxonomic author abbreviation of Karl Maximovich (1827–1891), Russian botanist
- MakSim, Russian female singer
- Maksim, Metropolitan of all Rus, Metropolitan of Kiev (1283–1305)
- Maksim, Bulgarian Patriarch (1914–2012), Patriarch of the Bulgarian Orthodox Church
- Maksim, Serbian Patriarch (d. 1680), Patriarch of the Serbian Orthodox Church (1655-1674)
- Maksim Branković (d. 1516), Serbian Orthodox Metropolitan of Belgrade and Syrmia

== Other uses ==
- Maxim, New Jersey, an unincorporated community in Monmouth County, New Jersey, United States
- Maxim (philosophy), a principle that an individual uses in making a decision
- Maxim (coffee), the first American brand of freeze-dried coffee, made by General Foods
- Maxim gun, the first self-acting machine gun
- Maxim Cup, South Korean Go competition
- Maxim DL, software package created by Cyanogen Imaging
- Maxim Wien, brothel in Vienna, Austria
- Legal maxim, certain guiding principles of law and jurisprudence
- Pragmatic maxim, maxim of logic formulated by Charles Sanders Peirce
- SilencerCo Maxim 50, a muzzle-loading rifle that includes an integrated sound suppressor

== See also ==
- Aphorism
- Maxima (disambiguation)
- Maxime (disambiguation)
