= Orthodox Patriarch =

The term Orthodox Patriarch may refer to:

== Eastern Orthodoxy ==
- Ecumenical Patriarch of Constantinople, head of the Greek Orthodox Church of Constantinople
- Greek Orthodox Patriarch of Alexandria, head of the Greek Orthodox Church of Alexandria
- Greek Orthodox Patriarch of Antioch, head of the Greek Orthodox Church of Antioch
- Greek Orthodox Patriarch of Jerusalem, head of the Greek Orthodox Church of Jerusalem
- Russian Orthodox Patriarch, head of the Russian Orthodox Church
- Serbian Orthodox Patriarch, head of the Serbian Orthodox Church
- Bulgarian Orthodox Patriarch, head of the Bulgarian Orthodox Church
- Romanian Orthodox Patriarch, head of the Romanian Orthodox Church
- Georgian Orthodox Patriarch, head of the Georgian Orthodox Church

== Oriental Orthodoxy ==
- Coptic Orthodox Patriarch of Alexandria, head of the Coptic Orthodox Church of Alexandria
- Syriac Orthodox Patriarch of Antioch, head of the Syriac Orthodox Church of Antioch
- Armenian Orthodox Patriarch of Jerusalem, head of the Armenian Orthodox Church of Jerusalem
- Armenian Orthodox Patriarch of Constantinople, head of the Armenian Orthodox Church of Constantinople
- Ethiopian Orthodox Patriarch, head of the Ethiopian Orthodox Tewahedo Church
- Eritrean Orthodox Patriarch, head of the Eritrean Orthodox Tewahedo Church

== See also ==
- Orthodox (disambiguation)
- Patriarch (disambiguation)
