= S. maximus =

S. maximus may refer to:

- Saltator maximus, the buff-throated saltator, a seed-eating bird species that breeds from southeastern Mexico to western Ecuador and northeastern Brazil
- Saurophaganax maximus, an allosaurid dinosaur species from the Morrison Formation of Jurassic North America

== See also ==
- Maximus (disambiguation)
