= L. maximum =

L. maximum may refer to:

- Leucanthemum maximum, the max chrysanthemum, a flowering plant species native to France and Spain
- Lithophragma maximum, the San Clemente Island woodland star, a rare flowering plant species endemic to San Clemente Island, California

== See also ==
- Maximum (disambiguation)
