= Maxime =

Maxime is a French masculine given name that may refer to:

== People ==
- Maxime Alexandre (born 1971), Belgian-Italian cinematographer
- Maxime Moses Alexandre (1899–1976), French poet associated with Surrealism
- Maxime Bally (born 1986), Swiss professional racing cyclist
- Maxime Bernier (born 1963), former Canadian Minister of Foreign Affairs
- Maxime Bôcher (1867–1918), American mathematician
- Maxime Bossis (born 1955), French footballer
- Maxime Bouet (born 1986), French road racing cyclist
- Maxime Brunerie (born 1977), French convicted criminal and former neo-Nazi activist
- Maxime Boyer (born 1984), Canadian professional wrestler
- Maxime Carlot Korman (born 1941), Vanuatuan politician
- Maxime Chattam (born 1976), French novelist
- Maxime Chaya (born 1961), Lebanese explorer
- Maxime Collin (born 1979), Canadian actor
- Maxime Cressy (born 1997), American tennis player
- Maxime Daniel (born 1991), French cyclist
- Maxime Du Camp (1822–1894), French writer and photographer
- Maxime Dupé (born 1993), French footballer
- Maxime Faget (1921–2004), American mechanical engineer
- Maxime Godart (born 1999), French actor
- Maxime Gonalons (born 1989), French footballer
- Maxime Guyon (born 1989), French flat racing jockey
- Maxime Hordies (born 1996), Belgian para-cyclist
- Maxime Laheurte (born 1985), French Nordic combined athlete
- Maxime Laisney (born 1981), French politician
- Maxime Le Forestier (born 1949), French singer
- Maxime Lestienne (born 1992), Belgian footballer
- Maxime Lopez (born 1997), French footballer
- Maxime Macenauer (born 1989), Canadian ice hockey player
- Maxime Martin (born 1986), Belgian racing driver
- Maxime Médard (born 1986), French Rugby Union player
- Maxime Méderel (born 1980), French road bicycle racer
- Maxime Minot (born 1987), French politician
- Maxime Monfort (born 1983), Belgian racing cyclist
- Maxime Ouellet (born 1981), Canadian ice hockey player
- Maxime Partouche (born 1990), French footballer
- Maxime Raynaud (born 2003), French basketball player
- Maxime Rodinson (1915–2004), French historian, sociologist, Marxist, and orientalist
- Maxime Rodriguez (born 1975), French composer
- Maxime Talbot (born 1984), Canadian ice hockey player
- Maxime Vachier-Lagrave (born 1990), French chess super-Grandmaster
- Maxime Valet (born 1978), French wheelchair fencer
- Maxime Vantomme (born 1986), Belgian racing cyclist
- Maxime Verhagen (born 1956), former Dutch Minister of Foreign Affairs, and historian
- Maxime Weygand (1867–1965), French military commander in World War I and World War II

== Other ==
- Maximes, a 1665 book by François de La Rochefoucauld
- Maxime (film), a 1958 French comedy film
- Olympe Maxime, the headmistress of the wizarding school Beauxbatons in the world of Harry Potter
- Maxime Le Mal, a supervillain played by Will Ferrell in the 2024 film Despicable Me 4
- Maxime, a member of the New Mutants in Marvel Comics

== See also ==
- Maxim (given name), a male first name of Roman origin, and relatively common in Slavic language speaking countries
- Maxim (disambiguation)
- Maximus
- Massimo
