= Maksymowicz =

Maksymowicz is a Polish patronymic surname developed from the given name Maksym, Maksim, Maksymilian.

Archaic feminine forms are Maksymowiczowa (by husband), Maksymowiczówna (by father); they still can be used colloquially. It may be transliterated as: Maksimowicz, Maksymovicz, Maksymovych, Maksymovich, Maksimovich, Maximovich or in Serbian Maksimović.

Notable people with this surname include the following:

- Teodor Maksymowicz (1902–1983), Polish Pentecostal pastor and a prominent leader of the Christian Evangelical Faith Union
- Virginia Maksymowicz (born 1952), American artist
- Wojciech Maksymowicz (born 1955), Polish neurosurgeon, minister of health, member of Sejm

== Transliterated ==
- Ivan Pavlovich Maksimovich (1864–1931), Ukrainian colonel
- Karl Maximovich (1827–1891), Russian botanist.
- Mykhailo Maksymovych (1804–1873), professor in plant biology, historian and writer
