= Noveske Rifleworks =

American firearms company

- Type: Manufacturer
- Industry: Firearms
- Founded: 2001; 25 years ago in Grants Pass, Oregon, USA.
- Founder: John Noveske
- Website: noveske.com

Noveske Rifleworks is an American firearms company. They are headquartered in Grants Pass, Oregon and are known for their work with the AR-15 platform and the KeyMod attachment system.

== Overview ==
Noveske Rifleworks was founded in 2001 by John Noveske. They are highly regarded with a strong reputation.

They are based in Grants Pass, Oregon. Their slogan is “the All-American Badass Rifle Company.”

== History ==
In 2012, Noveske introduced KeyMod, a new system for attaching weapons accessories which soon became an industry and military standard.

In 2013 John Noveske died in a car accident. Noveske's death spawned a number of conspiracy theories.

The company was restructured after Noveske's death, in 2014 Tim Dillon took over as president and chief executive officer.

A Noveske N4 was one of the weapons used in the 2017 Las Vegas shooting.

In 2019 Noveske was one of ten companies selected by the US Army to present a subcompact weapon for evaluation under the Project Manager Soldier Weapons program, Noveske presented the Noveske subcompact weapon.

In 2019 Noveske introduced a water gun styled after their AR pattern rifles. It was produced in collaboration with lifestyle brand URT Inc.

In 2019 Noveske released their fourth generation of AR platform rifles.

Between 2007 and 2020 Noveske was awarded US military contracts worth nearly $4.9 million.

== Products ==
=== Firearms ===
- Nosler Varmageddon AR, in collaboration with Nosler and chambered in 22 Nosler
- Noveske subcompact weapon
- “Heat Model” Colt 733 Enhanced Clone Package, a collaboration with Dead Air Silencers based on a gun used in Heat (1995 film) and modeled on the Colt 733
- Noveske9, 9mm parabellum chambered AR
- Space Invader

=== Water guns ===
- Water Hog 5000 sqURT

=== Other ===
- Ammunition, Noveske branded but produced by Nosler

== Users ==
- United States: US Navy Seals

== Popular culture ==
In the 2010 film The Expendables some of the characters wield Noveske N4s.
