= Lufia: Curse of the Sinistrals =

2010 video game

- Developers: Neverland; Square Enix
- Publishers: JP: Square Enix; NA: Natsume Inc.
- Director: Masahide Miyata
- Producer: Hajime Kojima
- Writer: Masahide Miyata
- Composers: Yasunori Shiono; Tomoko Morita; Yukio Nakajima
- Series: Lufia
- Platform: Nintendo DS
- Release: JP: February 25, 2010; NA: October 12, 2010
- Genre: Action role-playing
- Mode: Single-player

Lufia: Curse of the Sinistrals, released as Estpolis: The Lands Cursed by the Gods (エストポリス) in Japan, is an action role-playing game video game co-developed by Neverland and Square Enix for the Nintendo DS. It is a remake of the 1995 Super Nintendo Entertainment System game Lufia II: Rise of the Sinistrals, also developed by Neverland. The character re-designs are by former Square Enix character designer, Yusuke Naora.

== Gameplay ==
Unlike previous Lufia games, this is an action-RPG game. Gameplay is no longer turn-based; players can roam around freely and attack monsters without waiting for the battle scene to occur. Only one character can be playable on-screen. The player can choose a map to go to without fully navigating the map like Lufia: The Ruins of Lore. Players can equip armor and weapons that can give players unique abilities in combat. The game takes advantage of the dual screen. In certain battles or puzzle-solving, certain actions may be disabled or the top-screen is used to navigate actions committed by bosses. Characters do not gain experience from defeating certain bosses. Players can press the feather button on the screen to go back to the stage selection menu. Players can also hit the rewind button to go back to the previous dungeon. These options may not be available if an essential event is going to be triggered in that area. Like in all Lufia games, The Ancient Cave returns.

=== Dungeons ===
Each dungeon is filled with puzzles to solve in order to advance. The player can jump and eventually double jump, after progressing past a certain point in the game, push blocks, carry objects, step on switches, open treasure chests, or trigger other events. In battle, the character the player controls is the one who gains the most experience when an enemy is defeated. The MP system that existed in previous Lufia games is not present in this title. Instead, all special abilities use IP, which is rechargeable. The player can choose to perform various types of abilities, including spells and powerful attacks. When an enemy dies, the player can continue attacking the monster until it disappears to gain bonus gold, experience, and possibly items. Each character has a special ability that is required to solve puzzles. Each time a character levels up, that character's HP and IP is restored and any negative effects are removed.

=== The GRID System ===
As the players progress through the game, they can gain access to the GRID system (known as the Mystic Stone Board in the U.S.), which allows them to customize stat boosts to their characters as well as other unique abilities. The players place blocks on the grid, which is filled with squares. Each block can either be a 2-square, a 3-square that is either a vertical or horizontal line, or a 2x2 4-square. Each square can increase INT, MGC, GUT, and CTR. When placed on the grid, these blocks can be combined to increase the level of the block, up to a maximum of four levels. Each character has their own grid of squares, which is either a 6x6 in the four center characters or a 3x12 in the two side characters. Each square with a symbol, such as a sword, can increase specific stats if a block is placed by them, but these squares can only be activated if each block all connects to the starting pointer that begins in between the character's block area. Once connected to the pointer, this starts a chain and any block adjacent to it activates. Blocks cannot overlap.

== Plot ==
The game begins with a prologue of Gades, announcing that the Sinistrals will wage war against Humanity. The story then proceeds with its focus on Maxim, a young monster hunter blessed with impressive and mysterious powers. He first approaches the Soma Shrine where he encounters a giant mech-golem-like monster, who is revealed to be Gades, the Sinistral of Destruction.

Maxim embarks on a journey to destroy the troubles caused by the land. Within his journey, he meets up with his best friend Tia and also meets up with other warriors around the land to defeat the havoc caused by the Sinistrals.

== Characters ==
- Maxim is a monster hunter blessed with impressive and mysterious powers. His primary weapon is the sword and he is the most balanced character in the party. His special ability is to quickly dash forward and strike, enabling him to reach areas that can't be accessed by jumping. His primary element is fire.
- Selan is the commander of the Parcelyte army, and Maxim's wife. Her weapon is the chakram and she excels as a magic user. Her special ability is to throw her chakram and control the movement of it in mid-air, allowing her to strike distant or unreachable objects and monsters. Her primary element is ice.
- Guy is a charismatic warrior from Tanbel who is known for his massive strength. His weapon is the axe and is best known for his defense and massive attack power. His special ability allows him to destroy certain types of terrain and objects that are otherwise indestructible. His primary element is thunder.
- Tia is Maxim's best friend. Her weapon is her suitcase that contains various gadgetry. Her special ability is a grappling hook, allowing her to grab objects from a distance or to swing across gaps. Her primary element is water.
- Artea is an elf from Eserikto. His weapon is the gun. He is the only character that can float in the air. His special ability is to lock onto numerous objects/monsters and fire his weapon to hit them at the same time. His primary element is light.
- Dekar: is the self-proclaimed strongest warrior in the world from Bound Kingdom. Though he does not have a special ability like the others, he can use any weapon (except for the Dual Blade), making him the most versatile character in combat.

== Development and release ==
In 2009, Square Enix announced a new game in the Lufia series for the Nintendo DS. According to Famitsu, Estpolis: The Lands Cursed by the Gods is a remake of Lufia II. Square-Enix made some major changes to the original, the most prominent being that The Lands Cursed by the Gods was to be an action RPG, while Rise of the Sinistrals was turn-based. The Lands Cursed by the Gods features 3D graphics and voice acting. The game was released for Nintendo DS on February 25, 2010 in Japan. The new Estpolis was developed by series creator Neverland, with much of the staff of Lufia II closely involved with the project. This Estpolis is an action-RPG reboot of Estpolis Denki II, which originally hit the Super NES in 1996. The version for North America was released on October 12 the same year.

== Reception ==
Reception

Aggregate score
| Aggregator | Score |
|---|---|
| Metacritic | 80/100 |

Review scores
| Publication | Score |
|---|---|
| Famitsu | 30/40 |
| GamePro | 3.5/5 |
| GamesRadar+ | 4.5/5 |
| IGN | 8.5/10 |
| Nintendo Life | 9/10 |
| Nintendo Power | 8/10 |
| RPGFan | 86% |

The game sold 14,000 copies the week of its release in Japan, but it was nonetheless a financial bomb. It was met with criticism by Famitsu, who stated that while the 3D graphics made the environments seem attractive, the camera controls had problems. One editor wrote that the camera angles are hard to see in some places, making it hard to figure out what's accessible and what's too high to reach.

Curse of the Sinistrals received positive reviews from Western publications, with an overall aggregate score of 80 out of 100 at Metacritic. IGN gave the game a score 8.5 out of 10, praising its action-focused experience, character-swapping dynamic, well-written dialogue scenes, and puzzles which it compares favourably to The Legend of Zelda, concluding that Lufia is "a great DS adventure". GamesRadar+ gave the game a score of four-and-a-half stars out of five, praising its charming characters, environments, challenging puzzles, and fun minigames, concluding that it is "a charming, beautiful, and accessible title that dares to be different while paying homage to the original".
