= Maxima =

Maxima may refer to:

== People ==
- Maxima of Rome, early Christian saint and martyr
- Maxima of Lisbon, early Christian saint and martyr
- Queen Máxima of the Netherlands (born 1971)
- Máxima Acuña, Peruvian activist
- Maxima Goffi (born 2008), French footballer
- Maximilla, also known as Maxima, early Montanist figure

== Science and mathematics ==
- Maxima and minima, the highest and lowest values of a function in calculus
- Maxima (software), a free open-source computer algebra system
- Millimeter Anisotropy eXperiment IMaging Array, a cosmic microwave background experiment

== Vehicles ==
- Voith Maxima, a locomotive family built by Voith Turbo
- Nissan Maxima, an automobile manufactured by Nissan

== Other uses ==
- Maxima (music), a musical note value in mensural notation
- Máxima (magazine), a Portuguese magazine
- Maxima (DC Comics), a character in the DC comics universe
- Maxima Group, a retail chain in Lithuania, Latvia, Estonia, Bulgaria and Poland
- Maxima Pictures, an Indonesian house film production
- Máxima (TV series), a TV series based on the early life of Queen Máxima of the Netherlands
- Maxima, an Austrian magazine owned by BIPA, a health and beauty chain owned by REWE Group
- Maxima, a character in The King of Fighters

== See also ==
- Macsyma, an early symbolic mathematical system developed at MIT
- Maxim (disambiguation)
- Maxime (disambiguation)
- Maximón, a folk saint venerated in various forms by Maya people of several towns in the highlands of Western Guatemala.
- Maximum (disambiguation)
- Maximus (disambiguation)
