= Maxam (surname) =

Maxam is a surname, a variant of Maxim. Notable people with the surname include:

- Allan Maxam (born 1942), American geneticist
- Larry L. Maxam (1948–1968), American marine
- Louella Maxam (1891–1970), American actress
- Noel Maxam (born 1967), American television director, producer, and writer
