= Lufia =

Video game series

- Logo
- Genre: Role-playing video game
- Developers: Neverland Co., Ltd. Atelier Double (The Ruins of Lore)
- Publishers: Taito; Square Enix; Natsume Inc. Atlus USA
- Platforms: Super Nintendo Entertainment System, Game Boy Color, Mobile phone, Game Boy Advance, Nintendo DS
- First release: Lufia & the Fortress of Doom; June 25, 1993
- Latest release: Lufia: Curse of the Sinistrals; February 25, 2010

Lufia, known as Estpolis Denki (エストポリス伝記, Esutoporisu Denki; officially translated "Biography of Estpolis") in Japan, is a series of role-playing video games developed by Neverland (aside from The Ruins of Lore, which was developed by Atelier Double). In Japan, the games were originally published by Taito and later, its now-parent company Square Enix (with Curse of the Sinistrals), and after the closing of Taito's North American branch after the release of the first game, Natsume Inc. (Rise of the Sinistrals, The Legend Returns, and Curse of the Sinistrals) and Atlus USA (The Ruins of Lore) in the U.S. While the games are primarily traditional 2D RPGs, they draw on elements from many other genres including action-adventure, monster collecting, and puzzle games. In the 1990s, the games were originally developed on the Super NES while the most recent installment, Lufia: Curse of the Sinistrals, was developed for the Nintendo DS and released in 2010 for Japan on February 25 and for North America on October 12. A port of the first two games in the series, Lufia I & II: The Sinistrals Saga, is set to be released in 2027. The series currently consists of six games, including this most recent installment.

== Setting ==
The Lufia series spans the course of two centuries, beginning with the defeat of the god-like Sinistrals in Lufia II: Rise of the Sinistrals. These events are followed by Ruins of Lore, which takes place 20 years after Rise of the Sinistrals ends. Fortress of Doom picks up another 79 years (99 years after the events of Rise of the Sinistrals) later. The current series ends with the Sinistrals' final defeat in Legend Returns, which takes place 101 years after Fortress of Doom.

In 2010, a re-telling was released on the Nintendo DS called Lufia: Curse of the Sinistrals. This version is very different from the original with new characters and gameplay, but does not extend the timeline.

== Characters ==
Lufia follows the exploits of the hero Maxim and his quest to defeat the Sinistrals; after his death, this task is taken up by his descendants through several generations.

Maxim is a hired monster hunter who slowly gathers a group of allies to fight against the Sinistrals. These include a good friend of his Tia, a warrior named Guy, a strong soldier called Dekar, a commander of the military called Selan, and an elf called Artea.

One of his descendants is Wain, the main male protagonist of The Legend Returns, a swordsman from the isolated coastal village of Patos.

== List of media ==
=== Video games ===
Game	Details
Lufia & the Fortress of Doom Original release date(s): JP: June 25, 1993; NA: December 4, 1993	Release years by system: Super Nintendo Entertainment System, Mobile Phones
Lufia & the Fortress of Doom Original release date(s): JP: June 25, 1993; NA: December 4, 1993	Notes: The first game in the Lufia series made for the Super Famicom published in Japan in June 1993 (under the name Estpolis Denki) and later that year for the SNES in North America, it starts out with a prologue where a team of warriors defeat the evil group of super-beings called the Sinistrals. Then, the story changes to the main story of the descendants of these heroes, and how the Sinistrals are trying to be reborn. The game was ported to Japanese mobile phones in 2009.
Lufia II: Rise of the Sinistrals Original release date(s): JP: February 24, 1995; NA: August 1996; EU: 1997	Release years by system: Super Nintendo Entertainment System
Lufia II: Rise of the Sinistrals Original release date(s): JP: February 24, 1995; NA: August 1996; EU: 1997	Notes: Lufia II: Rise of the Sinistrals, released in Japan for the Super Famicom under the name Estpolis Denki II, is a prequel to Lufia & The Fortress of Doom that takes place right before the events of the first game occurred. Notably, it ends partly with the events that begin the first Lufia. It was released in Europe as simply "Lufia" because Lufia & the Fortress of Doom was not released in Europe. This often causes some confusion.
Lufia: The Legend Returns Original release date(s): JP: September 7, 2001; NA: September 20, 2001; EU: October 23, 2001	Release years by system: Game Boy Color
Lufia: The Legend Returns Original release date(s): JP: September 7, 2001; NA: September 20, 2001; EU: October 23, 2001	Notes: Released in Japan in 2001 as Estpolis Denki: Yomigaeru Densetsu, and later the same month in America, Lufia: The Legend Returns is the series' first handheld adventure on the Game Boy Color. Taking advantage of the Game Boy's new enhanced color palette, the game features sophisticated 8-bit graphics, a new battle system and randomized dungeons. In this game, the player acts as a descendant of Maxim in the fight against the Sinistrals.
Lufia: The Ruins of Lore Original release date(s): JP: March 8, 2002; NA: May 6, 2003	Release years by system: Game Boy Advance
Lufia: The Ruins of Lore Original release date(s): JP: March 8, 2002; NA: May 6, 2003	Notes: Lufia: The Ruins of Lore was released for the Game Boy Advance in Japan in 2002 as Estpolis Gaiden: Chinmoku no Iseki and a year later in North America. It is a gaiden or "sidestory" game that deviates from the normal lore of the series. It was published by Taito in Japan and Atlus in America.
Estpolis Denki DX Original release date(s):	Release years by system: Mobile Phones
Estpolis Denki DX Original release date(s):	Notes: Estpolis Denki DX or Estpolis Biography DX is a mobile phone game only downloadable in Japan. It consists of the "Ancient Cave" scenario from Lufia II: Rise of the Sinistrals, featuring characters and enemies from the original game.
Lufia: Curse of the Sinistrals Original release date(s): JP: February 25, 2010; NA: October 12, 2010	Release years by system: Nintendo DS
Lufia: Curse of the Sinistrals Original release date(s): JP: February 25, 2010; NA: October 12, 2010	Notes: Titled Lufia: Curse of the Sinistrals, it was developed by the staff of the original Lufia. The game was released for the Nintendo DS on February 25, 2010, in Japan, and later the same year in North America. The game is a re-imagining of Lufia II: Rise of the Sinistrals with modified story and characters, as well as being an action RPG.

=== Canceled titles ===
Game	Details
Lufia: Ruins Chaser Original release date(s):	Release years by system: PlayStation
Lufia: Ruins Chaser Original release date(s):	Notes: Lufia: Ruins Chaser was a game being developed by Japanese software company Nihon-Flex for the PlayStation until they went bankrupt. For a time, development of the title ceased, but was picked up and heavily remade in both story and graphics, being renamed Lufia: The Legend Returns.
Lufia: Beginning of a Legend Original release date(s):	Release years by system: Game Boy Color
Lufia: Beginning of a Legend Original release date(s):	Notes: Lufia: Beginning of a Legend was in development for the Game Boy Color alongside Ruins Chaser for the PlayStation, and was to be a prequel to Lufia II as it told of Maxim's early days as an adventurer years before the Sinistrals strike.

== Reception ==
Japanese and Western review scores
Game	Famitsu	GameRankings	Metacritic
Lufia & the Fortress of Doom	28/40	-	-
Lufia II: Rise of the Sinistrals	30/40	80%	-
Lufia: The Legend Returns	26/40	61%	-
Lufia: The Ruins of Lore	29/40	71%	76/100
Lufia: Curse of the Sinistrals	30/40	77%	80/100

== See also ==
- List of Square Enix video game franchises
