= Lufia: The Ruins of Lore =

2002 video game

- North American box art
- Developer: Atelier Double
- Publishers: JP: Taito; NA: Atlus
- Platform: Game Boy Advance
- Release: JP: March 8, 2002; NA: May 6, 2003
- Genre: Role-playing video game
- Mode: Single-player

Lufia: The Ruins of Lore, known in Japan as Chinmoku no Iseki: Estpolis Gaiden (沈黙の遺跡 ～エストポリス外伝～), is a role-playing video game developed by Atelier Double and published by Taito in Japan in 2002 and by Atlus a year later in North America. It is the fourth title in the Lufia series of video games and was released as a "gaiden", or side story, to the main series; as a result, it does not feature many elements common to the rest of the series, such as the Sinistrals and the Dual Blade.

== Gameplay ==
=== Combat ===
Much like the rest of the Lufia series, The Ruins of Lore plays like a typical role-playing video game, where the player must advance through several scenarios and navigate dangerous dungeons, fighting enemies along the way. Unlike typical console RPGs, the battles are not random, and the monsters are displayed in the dungeon itself along with the characters. Combat only ensues when they come in contact with each other.

Winning battles grants the player experience points which go toward gaining levels, making the characters stronger in the process, and just like Lufia II: Rise of the Sinistrals, several monsters (called "Disc Monsters") can be captured instead of slain and used to fight with the party. The monsters can be fused with Eldin, Torma or Rami for three turns in combat once a character's Installation Points ("IP") reach their maximum. These points are visible by a gauge just beneath the characters hit points and ability points, and fill up when they are hit by an enemy.

== Plot ==
Lufia: The Ruins of Lore takes place 20 years after the events of Lufia II. After the defeat of the Sinistrals by Maxim, the world has enjoyed a season of relative peace, but is again threatened when the Kingdom of Gratze, a growing military superpower, allies itself with a mysterious man named Ragule and declared war on its bordering nations. Their primary goal is to scour the world in search of a powerful monster known simply as "The Beast", that, once under their control, would all but insure their conquest of the world. The game is told from the perspective of a young man named Eldin, who, during this age of conflict is traveling the world in search of adventure and intrigue. On his journey, he meets a young priestess named Rubius who is searching for mystic shards and stones that will allow her to enter a fabled holy land. One of the places she needs to go to obtain one is Ragule's fortress, and once they arrive, they meet the despot and realize that if the world is ever to be at peace again, he must be stopped at any cost.

== Reception ==
Reception

Aggregate scores
| Aggregator | Score |
|---|---|
| GameRankings | 71% |
| Metacritic | 76/100 |

Review scores
| Publication | Score |
|---|---|
| Edge | 7 of 10 |
| Electronic Gaming Monthly | 8 of 10 |
| Famitsu | 29/40 |
| Game Informer | 7.75 of 10 |
| GamePro | 4 of 5 |
| GameSpot | 6.6 of 10 |
| GameSpy | 2 of 5 |
| Nintendo Power | 3.4 of 5 |

The game was released to overall positive reviews. It received an 8/10 score from Electronic Gaming Monthly and a 7.75/10 from Game Informer. A dissenting view came from Nintendo Power which awarded it only 3.4 out of five. On the review aggregator site Metacritic, the game has an overall score of 76/100. On the similarly themed site GameRankings, it has a slightly lower score of 71%.
