= SilencerCo =

American firearm suppressor manufacturer

- Industry: Suppressors; Firearms; Small arms ammunition
- Founded: 2008; 18 years ago
- Founders: Jonathon Shults, Josh Waldron
- Headquarters: West Valley City, Utah, United States
- Number of employees: 290 (2017)
- Website: silencerco.com

SilencerCo, a leading manufacturer of firearm suppressors, is headquartered in West Valley City, Utah, and was founded in 2008.

== Products ==
The company's product offerings cover a variety of firearm types and calibers, including:

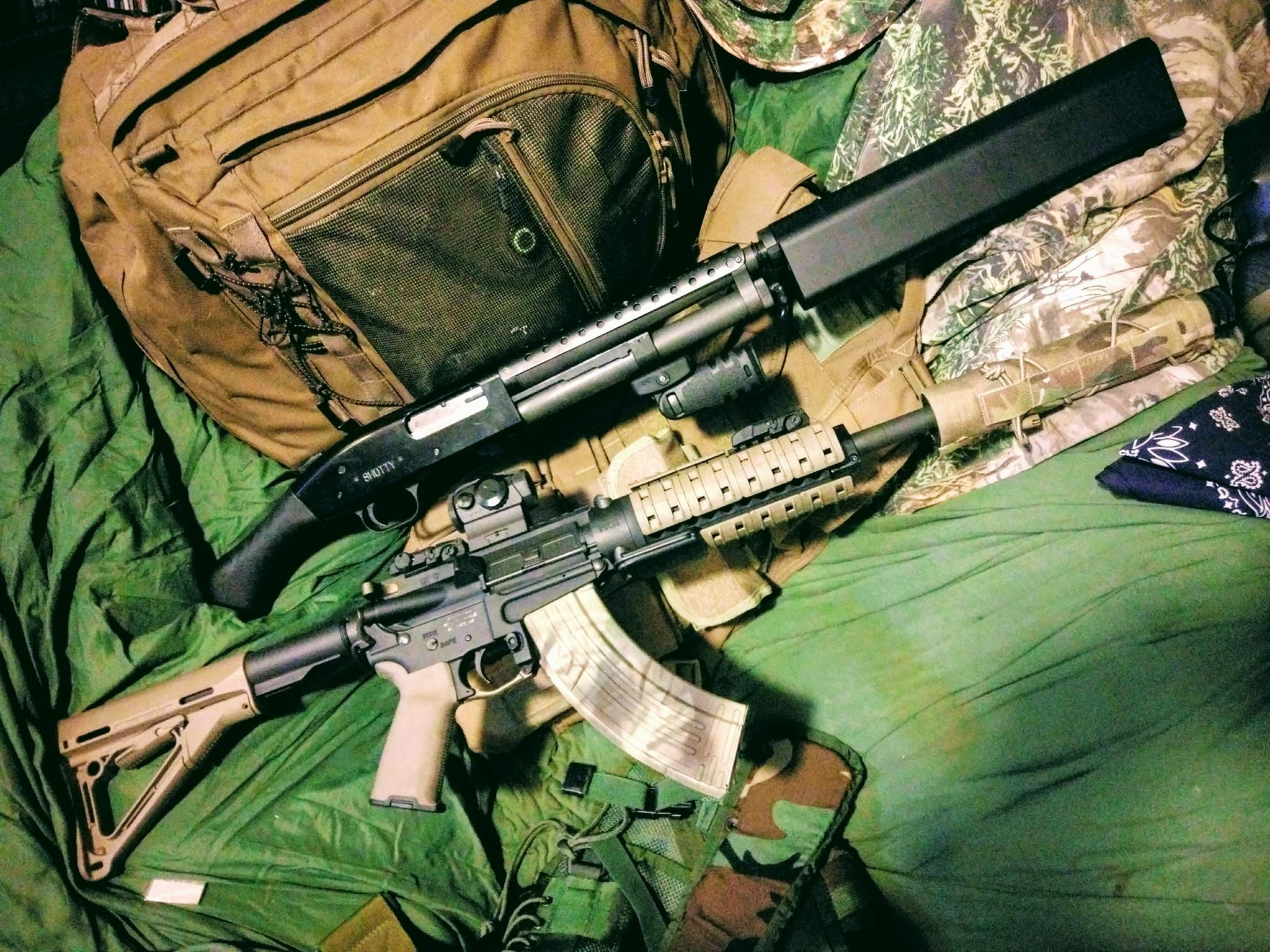
Firearms fitted with SilencerCo suppressors

- Sparrow 22, which is compatible with multiple calibers up to 5.7×28mm and rated for full-auto fire.
- Warlock 22, a .22 LR silencer that weighs 3.0 oz and reduces sound to 114.6 dB.
- Spectre 22, which handles a range of ammunition from .22 LR to 5.7×28mm.
- Switchback 22, which is compatible with multiple calibers up to 5.7×28mm and rated for full-auto fire.
- Osprey, which can be used with .300 Blackout subsonic rifle ammunition and is available in 9mm, .40, and .45 caliber bores.
- Octane, a multi-caliber centerfire pistol silencer compatible with a range of host firearms and available in 9mm and .45 caliber bores.
- Saker, which is available in a 5.56mm model, 7.62mm model and a short "K" 5.56mm model.
- Specwar, which is warrantied for short-barreled rifle use down to 10" in .223 Rem/5.56×45mm NATO.
- Harvester, which is compatible with a range of calibers from .22 Hornet to .300 Winchester Magnum for the Harvester 30 and up to .338 Lapua Magnum for the Harvester Big Bore 338.
- Omega, which is compatible with a range of ammunition from 5.7×28mm to .300 Winchester Magnum.
- Omega 9K/45K, a fully welded pistol can also rated to handle supersonic .300 Blackout.
- Salvo 12, which is designed to operate with nearly all shotguns and ammunition, including semi autos and inertia-driven models.
- Maxim 50, a muzzle-loading rifle with an integrated suppressor that is exempt from the National Firearms Act.
- Maxim 9, the first holster-able, integrally suppressed 9mm pistol, it was created to be used with any available variation of the 9mm ammo.

SilencerCo also offers a line of silencer-optimized ammunition and sells threaded pistol barrels for Glock 17L, Glock 17, Glock 21, Glock 19 and Glock 34 handguns.

== History ==
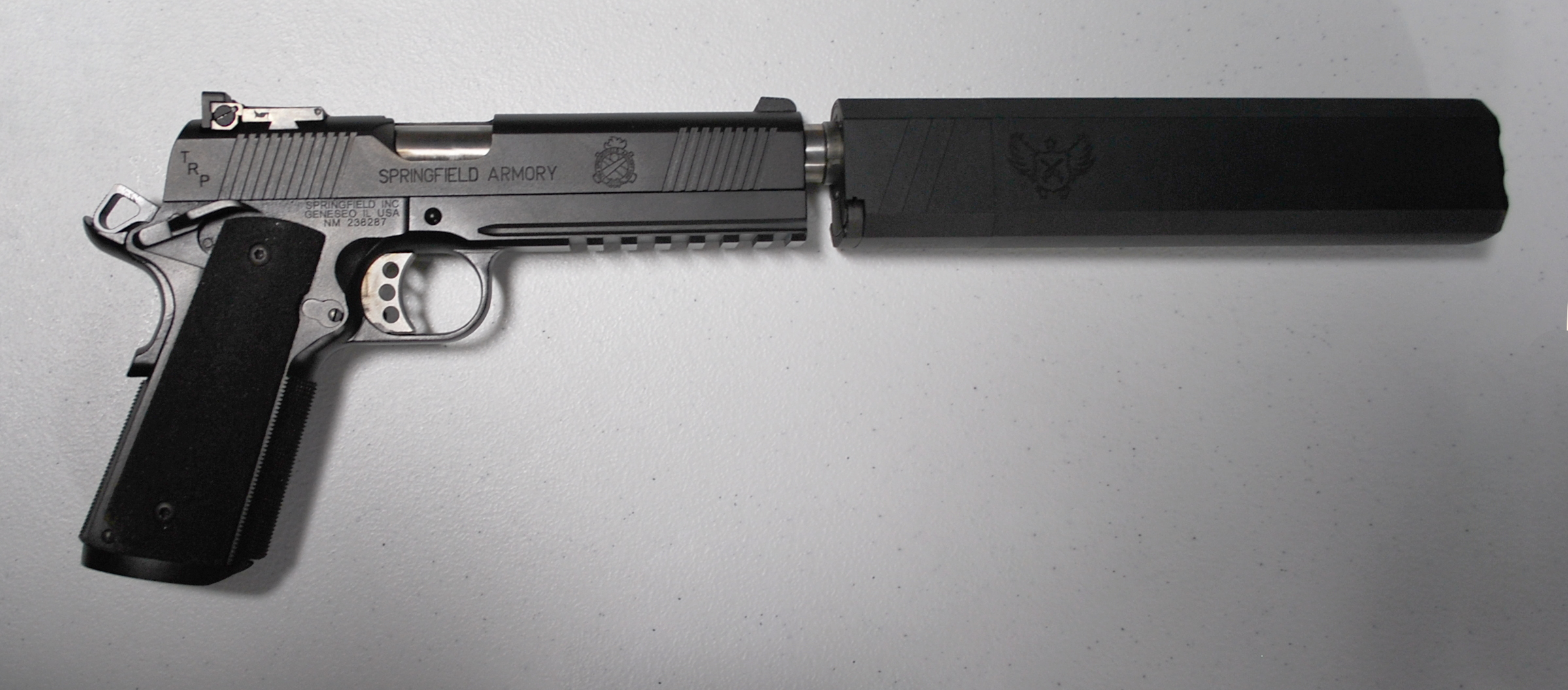
SilencerCo Osprey .45 suppressor on a Springfield pistol

SilencerCo was founded in 2008 by former President Jonathon Shults and Joshua Waldron. Soon after, SilencerCo launched its first product, a .22 caliber silencer called the Sparrow. SilencerCo specializes in creating products that enhance sound reduction levels, durability, form and function, ease of use and user serviceability.

Since 2015, the company has also provided legal counsel to customers to facilitate the silencer approval process.

== Acquisitions and growth ==
In 2011, SilencerCo acquired South Carolina-based SWR (Southeastern Weaponry Research) Manufacturing, a South Carolina-based company founded in 1994, specializing in the design and production of sound suppressors. This acquisition expanded SilencerCo's product line with the addition of the Warlock™ 22, Spectre™ 22, Octane™ 9 and Specwar™ 556, all existing SWR firearm suppressors.

SilencerCo was featured in the Inc. 5000 three years in a row, listed as #202 in 2013 with a three-year growth rate of 2,084%, #604 in 2014 with a three-year growth rate of 788% and #701 in 2015 with a three-year growth rate of 646%. Other honors include being listed as #4 of the Utah 100 and #20 in the Utah Fast 50.

In 2018 after a series of serious missteps that resulted in reduced sales and continuing layoffs, SilencerCo's board announced Josh Waldron and Jonathan Shults would step down from their roles as CEO and president, respectively

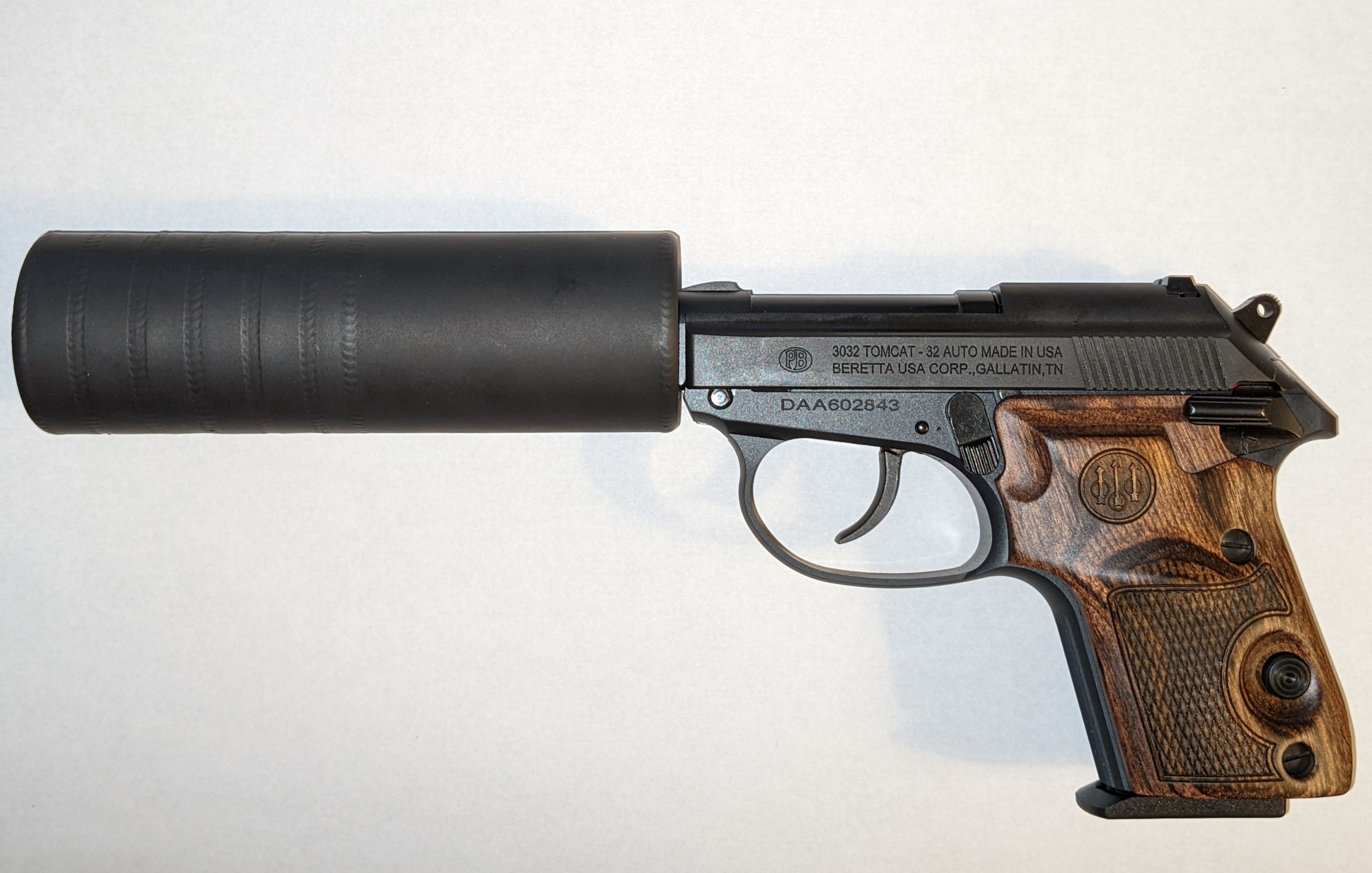
SilencerCo Omega 9k on a Beretta 3032 Tomcat

== Education and advocacy ==
As one of the founding members of the American Suppressor Association (ASA), SilencerCo has been a part of education efforts and promoting suppressor-friendly legislation.

In 2015, SilencerCo launched the #FightTheNoise campaign to increase awareness and educate individuals and lawmakers about the benefits of silencer ownership, advocate for the Second Amendment and promote suppressor-friendly legislation. Supporters of the "FightTheNoise" movement include free-ride mountain biker Cam Zink and UFC Heavyweight fighter Travis Browne.

SilencerCo sponsored the National Shooting Sports Foundation.

In 2017, Donald Trump Jr. had made a visit to SilencerCo's manufacturing plant in West Valley City, criticizing the National Firearms Act.

== Facility ==
Currently, SilencerCo operates out of a 72,000 square foot facility in West Valley City, Utah. The facility contains an array of CNC machines and houses an 80-yard indoor range and sound laboratory for accelerated testing and product development. The entire manufacturing process is completed in-house, from raw materials to finished product. SilencerCo has over 190 full-time employees, making up in-house R&D, Production, Assembly, Metal Finishing, Sales, Business Development and Marketing teams.

== See also ==
- Dead Air Silencers
