= Maksimović =

Maksimović (Serbian: Максимовић, pronounced [maksǐːmoʋitɕ]) is a Serbian patronymic surname meaning son of Maksim.

- Aleksandar Maksimović, Serbian sport wrestler
- Boban Maksimović, Swiss footballer
- Desanka Maksimović, Serbian poet
- Dragan Maksimović, actor
- Goran Maksimović, Serbian sports shooter
- Ivan Maksimović, musician
- Ivana Maksimović, sport shooter
- Jelena Maksimović, basketball player
- Ljubomir Maksimović, Serbian Byzantologist
- Marko Maksimović (football) (born 1984), Bosnian football manager
- Marko Maksimović (politician) (born 1947), Serbian politician
- Marko Maksimović (tennis) (born 2006), Serbian tennis player
- Mina Maksimović, basketball player
- Nemanja Maksimović, Serbian footballer
- Nikola Maksimović, footballer
- Novica Maksimović, footballer
- Rajko Maksimović, composer, writer, and music pedagogue
- Srđan Maksimović, footballer
- Suzana Maksimović, Serbian chess master

== Cognates ==
- Maksymowicz
- Analogous surname variously transliterated as Maksimovich, Maksymovyvch, Maximovich or Maximowicz (Cyrillic: Максимович) is also widespread in Ukraine and other Eastern European countries;
- Maximov - Russian version of the same surname.
