= Dead Air Silencers =

American manufacturing company

- Founded: 2014
- Founders: Mike Pappas; Todd Magee
- Key people: Eric Rogers (CEO)
- Website: deadairsilencers.com

Dead Air Silencers is an American firearms suppressor manufacturing company best known for their silencers.

== History ==
Dead Air Silencers was founded in 2014 by Mike Pappas and Todd Magee, both formerly of SilencerCo. They manufacture products for military, police, and civilian sales. Some of their silencers are intended for hunting use.

In the beginning they focused on the multicaliber silencer market producing silencers designed to be used with a number of different calibers. This due to the requirements of US commercial customers who must procure a different Bureau of Alcohol, Tobacco, Firearms and Explosives tax stamp for each silencer they own. Their first silencer was the Sandman series.

In 2018 Dead Air introduced Key-Mo, an adaptor which allows the use of Silencerco silencers with Dead Air muzzle devices.

== Products ==
=== Muzzle devices ===
- Pyro, muzzle brake

=== Silencers ===
- Odessa-9
- Primal, .46-caliber magnum rated
- Sandman, multiple variants
- Wolverine PBS-1, based on the Soviet PBS-1 silencer
- Mask HD
- Ghost-M, designed to mitigate first round pop

=== Other ===
- “Heat Model” Colt 733 Enhanced Clone Package, a collaboration with Noveske Rifleworks based on a gun used in Heat (1995 film) and modeled on the Colt 733

== Users ==
- United States Navy SEALs
