= Ihor Maksymenko =

Ukrainian kickboxer (born 1984)

Maksymenko Ihor Volodymorovych
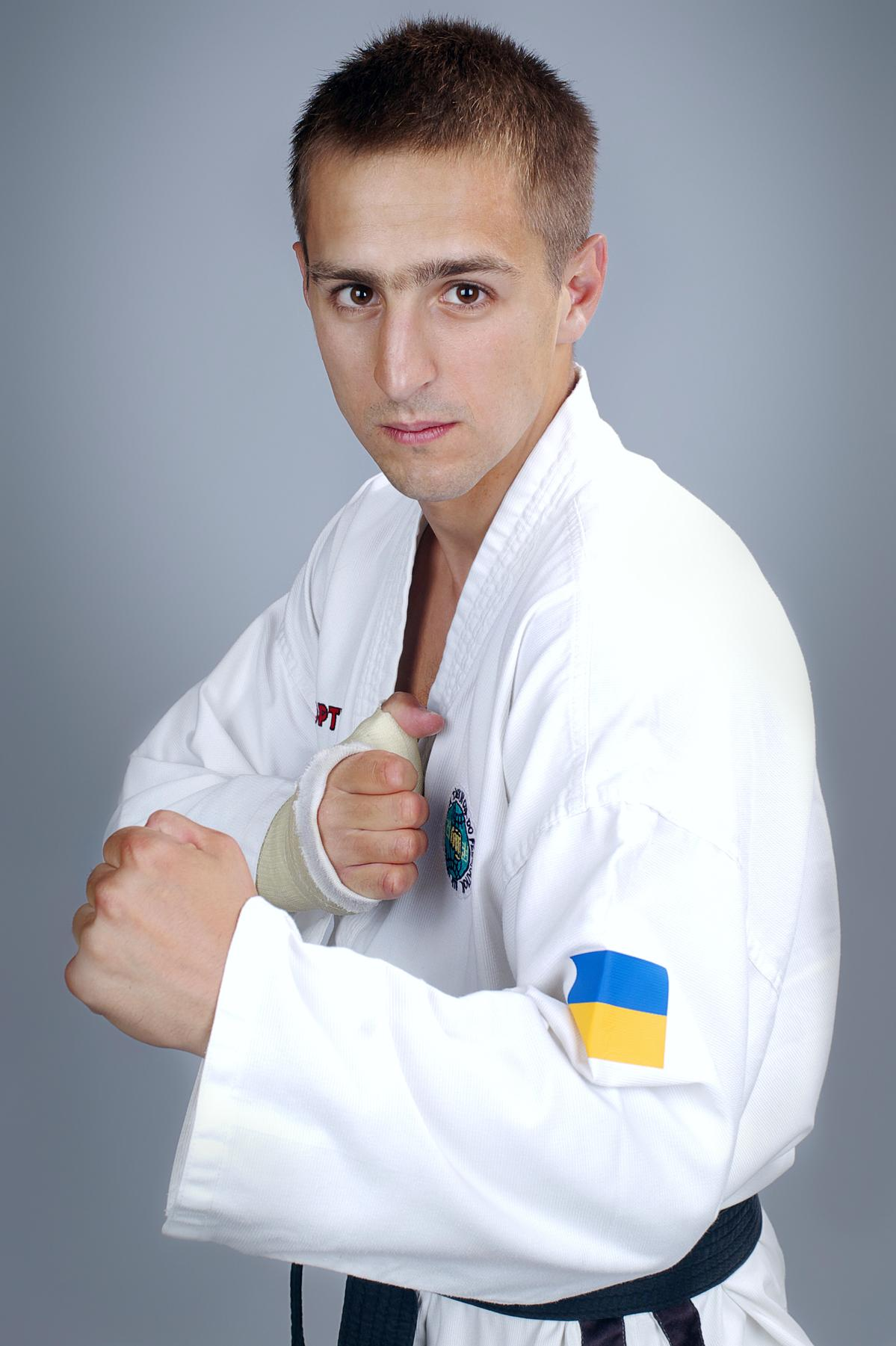
- Born: September 6, 1984 (age 42); Kharkiv, Ukraine
- Nationality: Ukrainian
- Height: 1.84 m (6 ft 1/2 in)
- Weight: 74 kg (163 lb)
- Style: Taekwondo, Kickboxing
- Team: Sports school #1 in Ivano-Frankivsk, Ukraine
- Trainer: Solovey Oleg, Chudnyh Grygoriy

Other information
- Notable club: Physical education-sport community "Ukraina"

Ihor Volodymyrovych Maksymenko (Ukrainian: Ігор Володимирович Максименко) — (September 6, 1984, Kharkiv) — master of sports of Ukraine of the international class in kickboxing and taekwondo, winner of World Cup in kickboxing.

== Biography ==
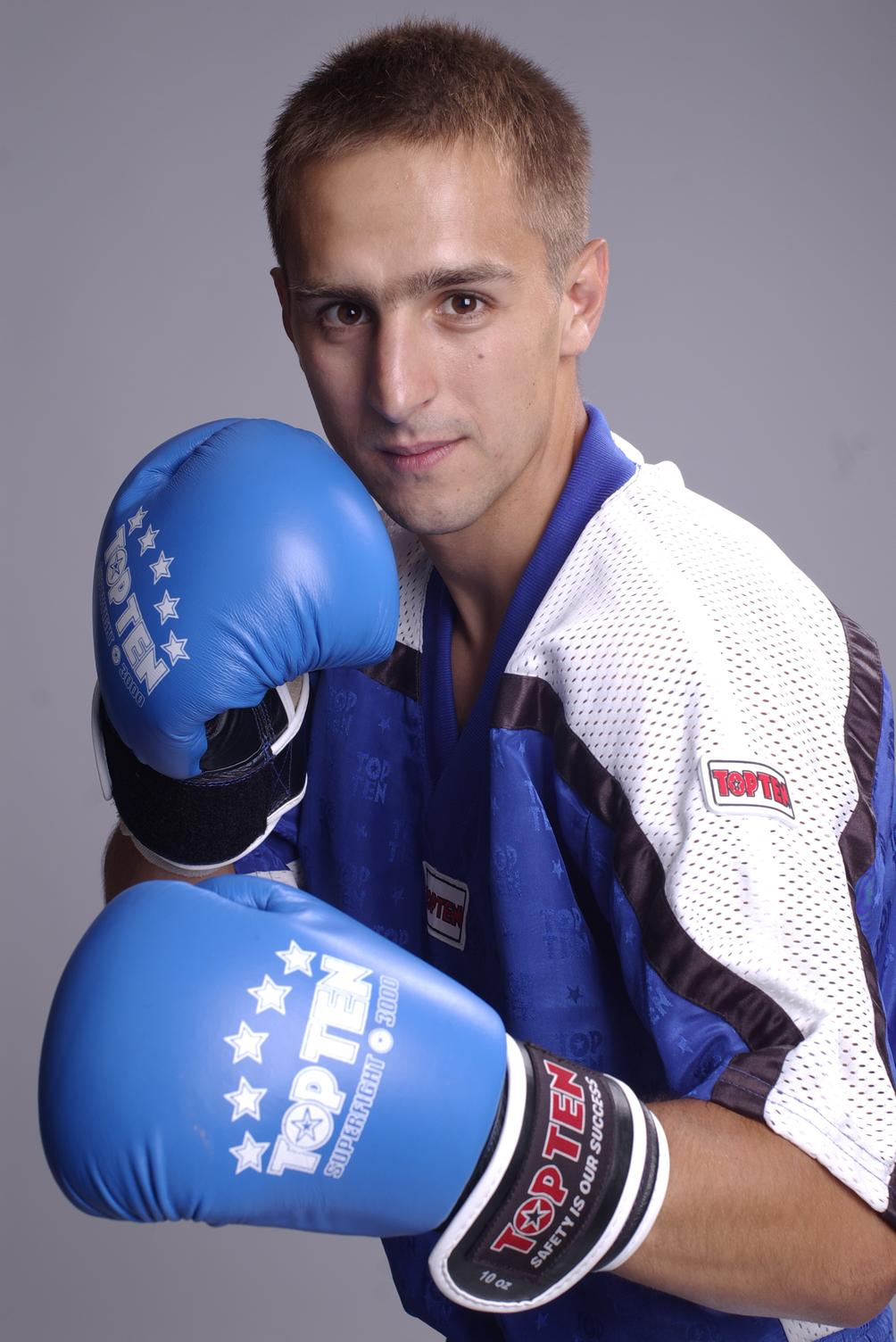

He was born on September 6, 1984, in Kharkiv, in the Ukrainian SSR of the Soviet Union (in present-day Ukraine). Ihor is of Ukrainian descdnt. Mother is Maksymenko Olena Anatoliivna, teacher of the elementary classes. Father is Maksymenko Volodymyr Anatoliiovych, metal worker/welder. Brothers are Ivan and Maksym, sisters are Iryna, Daryna and Anastasiia.

1991 – went to the first grade of the secondary school #66 of Kharkiv.
1993 – moved to the village of Komsomolske of Kharkiv Oblast. In the same year moved up to the secondary school #1 of Komsomolske which finished in 2001.
2002 – became the winner of the World Cup Peter the Great Cup in taekwondo. The same year he entered Kharkiv state academy of physical education at the specialty of trainer-instructor in taekwondo.
2004 – left the university due to personal reasons.
2004 – achieved the status of master of spots of Ukraine in taekwondo. The same year became the silver prize winner of World Cup in kickboxing (WAKO).
2005 – became the Champion of Europe in taekwondo (Italy) and passed international class of master of sports of Ukraine.
2007 – began the trainer activity in the All-Ukrainian Union of taekwondo, where has been working till nowadays.
2009 – became the winner of the World Cup of Europe in taekwondo (Poland).
2010 – became the winner of the professional tournament of PRO TKD (Moldova). In the following year updated the studies at the KSAPE (Russian: ХДАФК).
April 2011 – acquired the status of champion in the All-Ukrainian Union of taekwondo.
June 2011 – acquired the title of winner of the World Cup in kickboxing (WAKO «Bestfighter» — 2011), which was held in Rimini (Italy).

== Achievements ==
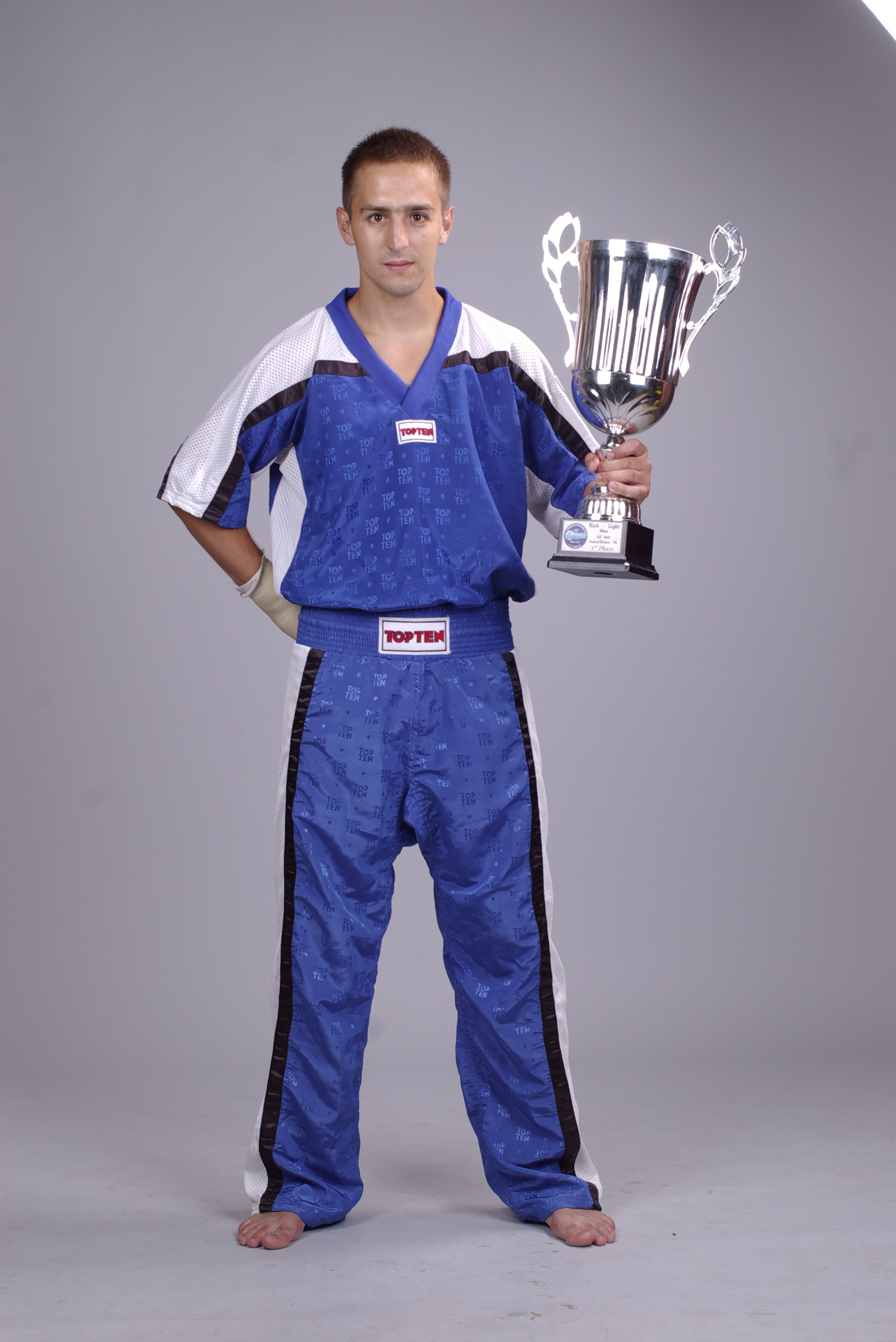

- World Cup winner of “Peter the Great Cup” in taekwondo — 2002;
- Master of sports of Ukraine in taekwondo — 2004;
- Silver prize winner of kickboxing (WAKO) — 2004;
- Champion of Europe in taekwondo— 2005;
- Master of sports of Ukraine in the international class of taekwondo— 2005;
- European Cup Winner in taekwondo— 2009;
- Winner of the professional tournament PRO TKD — 2010;
- Match Meeting winner of taekwondo Ukraine-Poland — 2010;
- Champion of All-Ukrainian Union of taekwondo — 2011;
- World Cup Winner in kickboxing WAKO Bestfighter — 2011.

== Interests ==
Sport, modern music, cars, travelling.
