= Maxim (surname) =

Maxim is a French and Dutch surname derived from the personal name Maxim. Notable people with the surname include:

- Alexandru Maxim (born 1990), Romanian footballer
- Alexandru Maxim (footballer, born 1986) (born 1986), Moldovan footballer
- Alexandru Maxim (footballer, born 2007) (born 2007), Romanian footballer
- Cristian Maxim (born 2003), Romanian footballer
- Florin Maxim (born 1981), Romanian football manager and player
- Hiram Maxim (1840–1916), American and British inventor
- Hiram Percy Maxim (1869–1936), American inventor and radio pioneer
- Hudson Maxim, U.S. inventor and chemist
- Joey Maxim, ring name of Giuseppe Antonio Berardinelli (1922–2001), American boxer
- John Maxim (1925–1990), British actor
- Marinela Maxim (born 1955), Romanian rower

== See also ==
- Maxam (surname)
