= Ivan Maksimov (footballer) =

Russian footballer

Personal information
- Full name: Ivan Vladimirovich Maksimov
- Date of birth: 11 June 1995 (age 31)
- Height: 1.65 m (5 ft 5 in)
- Position: Midfielder

Youth career
- 2011–2013: FC Volga Nizhny Novgorod
- 2013–2014: FC Krylia Sovetov Samara

Senior career*
| Years | Team | Apps | (Gls) |
| 2013–2014 | FC Krylia Sovetov Samara | 0 | (0) |
| 2014–2015 | FC Anzhi-2 Makhachkala | 4 | (0) |
| 2015 | FC Tosno | 2 | (0) |
| 2016 | FC Torpedo Vladimir | 13 | (1) |
| 2019 | FC Tekstilshchik Ivanovo | 6 | (0) |
| 2019 | FC Murom | 15 | (2) |
- * Club domestic league appearances and goals

Ivan Vladimirovich Maksimov (Russian: Иван Владимирович Максимов; born 11 June 1995) is a Russian former football midfielder.

== Club career ==
He made his debut in the Russian Professional Football League for FC Anzhi-2 Makhachkala on 25 October 2014 in a game against FC Terek-2 Grozny.

He made his Russian Football National League debut for FC Tosno on 11 July 2015 in a game against FC Fakel Voronezh.

== Personal life ==
His is the younger brother of footballer Ilya Maksimov.
