= Ilya Maksimov =

Russian footballer

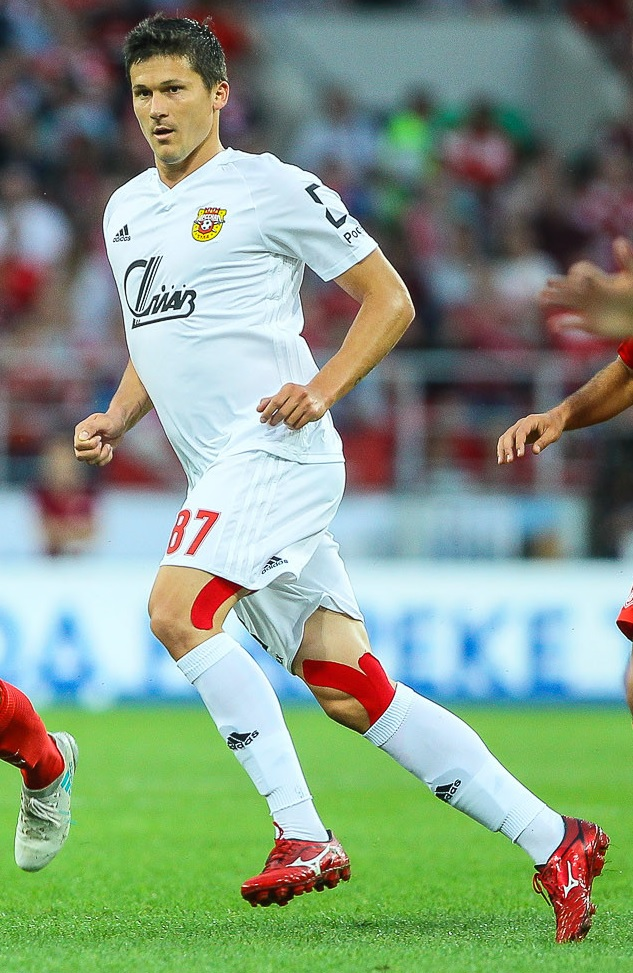
- Maksimov with Arsenal Tula in 2017

Personal information
- Full name: Ilya Vladimirovich Maksimov
- Date of birth: 2 February 1987 (age 39)
- Place of birth: Gorky, now Nizhny Novgorod, Russian SFSR
- Height: 1.83 m (6 ft 0 in)
- Position: Attacking midfielder

Youth career
- Spartak Moscow

Senior career*
Years	Team	Apps	(Gls)
2006–2010	Zenit Saint Petersburg	13	(0)
2008	→ Shinnik Yaroslavl (loan)	1	(0)
2008–2009	→ Sportakademklub Moscow (loan)	18	(4)
2009–2010	→ FC Khimki (loan)	15	(1)
2010–2011	FC Nizhny Novgorod	14	(6)
2011	Kuban Krasnodar	14	(0)
2011–2012	Volga Nizhny Novgorod	27	(4)
2012–2013	Krylia Sovetov Samara	13	(5)
2013–2016	Anzhi Makhachkala	65	(16)
2016–2018	Arsenal Tula	23	(2)
2018–2020	Khimik Dzerzhinsk (amateur)		

International career
2005	Russia U-19	6	(1)
2006–2007	Russia U-21	2	(0)
2011	Russia-2	1	(0)
2016	Russia	1	(0)
- * Club domestic league appearances and goals

Ilya Vladimirovich Maksimov (Russian: Илья Владимирович Максимов; born 2 February 1987) is a Russian former football central midfielder.

== International career ==
On 11 March 2016, he was called up to the Russia national football team for friendly games against Lithuania and France. He made his debut for the national team on 26 March in a game against Lithuania.

== Personal life ==
He is the older brother of footballer Ivan Maksimov.

== Career statistics ==
=== Club ===
As of 13 May 2018

Club	Season	League			Cup		Continental		Other		Total	
Club	Season	Division	Apps	Goals	Apps	Goals	Apps	Goals	Apps	Goals	Apps	Goals
Zenit St. Petersburg	2004	Russian Premier League	0	0	0	0	0	0	–		0	0
Zenit St. Petersburg	2005	Russian Premier League	0	0	1	0	0	0	–		1	0
Zenit St. Petersburg	2006	Russian Premier League	7	0	1	1	0	0	–		8	1
Zenit St. Petersburg	2007	Russian Premier League	6	0	4	0	4	1	–		14	1
Zenit St. Petersburg	Total		13	0	6	1	4	1	0	0	23	2
Shinnik Yaroslavl	2008	Russian Premier League	1	0	0	0	–		–		1	0
Sportakademklub Moscow	2008	FNL	18	4	–		–		–		18	4
Khimki	2009	Russian Premier League	15	1	0	0	–		–		15	1
Nizhny Novgorod	2010	FNL	14	6	0	0	–		–		14	6
Kuban Krasnodar	2011–12	Russian Premier League	14	0	1	0	–		–		15	0
Volga Nizhny Novgorod	2011–12	Russian Premier League	14	0	1	0	–		2 (Note: Two appearances in relegation play-offs)	2	17	2
Volga Nizhny Novgorod	2012–13	Russian Premier League	13	4	1	0	–		–		14	4
Volga Nizhny Novgorod	Total		27	4	2	0	0	0	2	2	31	6
Krylia Sovetov Samara	2012–13	Russian Premier League	9	4	–		–		1 (Note: One appearance in relegation play-offs)	0	10	4
Krylia Sovetov Samara	2013–14	Russian Premier League	4	1	–		–		–		4	1
Krylia Sovetov Samara	Total		13	5	0	0	0	0	1	0	14	5
Anzhi Makhachkala	2013–14	Russian Premier League	12	0	0	0	3	0	–		15	0
Anzhi Makhachkala	2014–15	FNL	31	10	2	0	–		–		33	10
Anzhi Makhachkala	2015–16	Russian Premier League	22	6	1	0	–		–		23	6
Anzhi Makhachkala	Total		65	16	3	0	3	0	0	0	71	16
Arsenal Tula	2016–17	Russian Premier League	13	1	0	0	–		2 (Note: Two appearances in relegation play-offs)	0	15	1
Arsenal Tula	2017–18	Russian Premier League	10	1	0	0	–		–		10	1
Arsenal Tula	Total		23	2	0	0	0	0	2	0	25	2
Career total			203	38	12	1	7	1	5	2	227	42
