= Patriarch (magazine) =

Patriarch was a magazine published from 1993 to 2004 by Philip H. Lancaster. The magazine was a self-published, bimonthly, subscription-based periodical. Lancaster was a minister in the Presbyterian Church in America (PCA) in which he was ordained in 1977. He left the PCA in 1996 since he had been serving for years in a non-Presbyterian church. He had founded Immanuel Family Fellowship in St. Louis, Missouri, in 1990, a "family-integrated church" consisting almost entirely of homeschooling families. He also served as a chaplain in the United States Army Reserve from 1981 to 1994. Patriarch was published from the Lancaster home, first in Arnold, Missouri (1993–94); then in Rolla, Missouri (1994-1998), and finally in Willis, Virginia (1998-2004). The magazine's mission was to promote a "Christ-like manhood" that is "neither tyrannical or wimpy" and a "home-centered lifestyle." The magazine promoted homeschooling, and Biblical patriarchy.

== See also ==
- Family Integrated Church
