= Maksymilian =

Maksymilian is the Polish form of the male given name Maximilian. Notable people with the name include:

- Andrzej Maksymilian Fredro (1620–1679), Polish noble, writer
- Franciszek Maksymilian Ossoliński (1676–1756), Polish noble, politician, collector and patron of arts
- Józef Maksymilian Ossoliński (1748–1829), Polish noble, politician, writer, founder of the Ossoliński Institute
- Maksymilian Stanisław Ryłło (1802–1848), Polish missionary, rectory and preacher
- Maksymilian Berezowski (1923–2001), Polish author, journalist, and erudite
- Maksymilian Ciężki (1899–1951), head of the German section of the Polish Cipher Bureau (BS–3) in the 1930s
- Maksymilian Faktorowicz (1877–1938), also known as Max Factor Sr. was a Polish-American businessman, beautician, entrepreneur and inventor.
- Maksymilian Gierymski (1846–1874), Polish painter, specializing mainly in watercolours
- Maksymilian Granieczny (born 2005), Polish volleyball player
- Maksymilian Jackowski (1815–1905), Polish activist, secretary-general of the Central Economic Society
- Maksymilian Kolbe (1894–1941), Polish Conventual Franciscan friar and a saint
- Maksymilian Małkowiak (1922–2009), Polish field hockey player
- Maksymilian Nowicki (1826–1890), Polish zoology professor and pioneer conservationist in Austrian Poland
- Tytus Maksymilian Huber (1872–1950), Polish mechanical engineer, educator, and scientist
