= Nikolai Maximov (physiologist) =

Nikolai Aleksandrovich Maximov (also spelled Maksimov, Russian: Николай Александрович Максимов; 21 March 1880 – 9 May 1952) was a Russian-Soviet plant physiologist. He examined frost damage and looked at frost resistance and noted that damage was caused mechanically by ice crystals and that resistance involved osmotic control of cell sap. He also found that drought resistance was not achieved by plants merely through reduction of transpiration but by other stress tolerance mechanisms. He has been considered the founder of ecological plant physiology research in the Soviet Union.

== Life and work ==
Maximov was born in St. Petersburg and was educated at the local Gymnasium (1897) before graduating from the St. Petersburg University in 1902. He worked for some time in the forestry institute before going in 1910 to Java and working at the Bogor botanical garden. He returned to obtain a master's degree on frost resistance in 1913 and then went to Tiflis botanical garden. He established a laboratory and began to work on plant physiology. He worked at Leningrad in 1921 and taught at the A. I. Herzen Pedagogical Institute from 1933. In 1933 he was arrested as a collaborator of Nikolai Vavilov under false charge of being a member of a revolutionary party. His wife however found that he could be released if someone outside of Moscow wrote to hire him. This was made possible by N. M. Tulaikov (1875–1938) who got him to work at Saratov. He moved to the K. A. Timiriazev Institute of Plant Physiology in 1939.

Maximov examined frost and drought resistance in plants. He found that a number of traits were involved in the drought resistance of xerophytes and not merely reduced transpiration as was then thought. He examined photoperiod and was able to suggest methods for yield increase in greenhouses under artificial lighting. He published a textbook of plant physiology which went through nine editions from 1926 to 1958 and influenced plant physiology research in the USSR. An English translation was produced by R.H. Yapp in 1929 while another translation was produced in 1930.
