= Maxime Moses Alexandre =

French poet

Maxime Moses Alexandre (1899–1976) was a French poet associated with Surrealism.

== Life ==
Maxime Alexandre was born into a liberal Jewish family in Wolfisheim. There his first language was German, although his family moved to Lausanne during World War I. There he learned French, and was introduced to Romain Rolland by René Schickelé.

Alexandre was active in the surrealist movement from its inception in 1924 until 1929, when he followed Louis Aragon out of the group. He contributed to both La Révolution surréaliste and Le Surréalisme au service de la révolution. A Communist, he also worked for the French Communist Party newspaper L'Humanité. He was imprisoned when World War II started.

In 1949 Alexandre converted to Roman Catholicism, though he later left the church in reaction to what he felt was the church's anti-Semitism.

== Works ==
- Les dessins de la liberté. 1927
- Le Corsage, 1931
- Mythologie personnelle, 1933
- Le Mal de nuit, 1935
- Sujet a l'amour, 1937
- Cassandre de Bourgogne, 1939
- Les yeux pour pleurer, 1945
- Le Juif errant, 1946
- Durst und Quelle, 1952
- La Peau et les os, 1956
- L'enfant de la terre, 1965. With illustrations by Jean Arp.
- Mémoires d'un surréaliste, 1968
- L'oiseau de papier, 1973. With illustrations by Jean Arp.
- Journal 1951–1975, 1976
