= Lufia & the Fortress of Doom =

1993 video game

- North American box art
- Developer: Neverland
- Publisher: Taito
- Director: Masahide Miyata
- Writer: Masahide Miyata
- Composers: Yasunori Shiono; Aki Zaitsu; Naomi Kuroda
- Series: Lufia
- Platform: Super NES
- Release: JP: 25 June 1993; US: November 1993
- Genre: Role-playing
- Mode: Single-player

Lufia & the Fortress of Doom, known as Estpolis Denki (エストポリス伝記, Esutoporisu Denki; Biography of Estpolis) in Japan, is a role-playing video game developed by Neverland and published by Taito in 1993, for the Super Nintendo Entertainment System. It is the first title in the Lufia series of video games and the only game from the series released under the Taito label in North America.

The game's plot follows The Hero, Lufia, Aguro, and Jerin on a quest to prevent the resurrection of four superpowered beings called Sinistrals, and frequently delves into the political and personal lives of the subjects of kingdoms all around the world. Top-down exploration is mixed with traditional turn-based combat using 2D sprites. The game was generally well-received, and has spawned multiple sequels on the Super Nintendo as well as the Game Boy Color, Game Boy Advance and the Nintendo DS.

== Gameplay ==
Lufia & the Fortress of Doom plays much like a traditional role-playing video game and features 2D character sprites and environments. The player advances the story by travelling through several harsh dungeons, encountering monsters along the way. These battles occur randomly or in scripted situations, and winning them yields experience points that go towards leveling up the characters, giving them access to new abilities and making them stronger in the process. The battles themselves take place from a first-person perspective, and require the player to use each character's strengths, such as physical attacks or magic use, as in many other mainstream RPGs.

An interesting quirk in the battle system, reminiscent of older RPGs like the early Dragon Quest games, makes it such that when ordering two characters to attack a particular enemy, and the first character defeats the enemy, the second character's attack will still target the defeated enemy and thus miss. Thus foresight is required to make sure that no characters' battle moves are wasted, unlike other RPGs, where other enemies will be targeted if the intended enemy has already been defeated.

New equipment and restorative items are purchased from vendors in various towns, or found in chests scattered throughout the world. The player's progress is saved in one of three available slots on the cartridge's built-in battery back-up system by speaking to a priest at a church found in most towns.

== Plot ==
=== Setting ===
The player character when in-town

The story of Lufia & the Fortress of Doom begins, in accordance with an ancient prophecy of the Lufia world, with a massive floating island with a large castle located on it emerging into the sky one dark day. Dubbed the "Fortress of Doom", this castle served as the base of operations for a group of all-powerful beings known as the Sinistrals, who planned to use their strength to bring the world to its knees.

In response, the people sent four of their bravest warriors: Maxim, Selan ("Serena" in Estopolis Denki), Artea ("Arty" in Estopolis Denki), and Guy, to infiltrate the dark fortress and destroy the Sinistrals before they could do any harm. The game begins with the player controlling these characters as they prepare to engage the Sinistrals, and eventually defeat them. After the battle, however, the fortress begins to collapse, with Maxim and Selan becoming trapped on the other side of a deep chasm that forms when the Sinistral throne room splits apart. Unable to teleport them to safety, Artea and Guy leave the falling island alone, and their trapped allies apparently perish when it crashes into the earth below.

Peace reigns for ninety years after the heroes' encounter with the Sinistrals, and the actual game is set nine years after that. The story is told from the perspective of a red-haired boy the player is in charge of naming, and along the way he gets caught up in a struggle to save the world once again from the newly emerged Sinistral army.

=== Story ===
A red haired boy who is a descendant of Maxim is playing in a field and is approached by a mystery girl who wants to join him in play. She introduces herself as Lufia and grows up with the boy, forming a close bond. Years later the boy grows up into a warrior and his attention is turned to an attack on a neighboring Kingdom to the north, where it is revealed that The Sinistral Gades is heading the attack. The warrior barely survives, and the presence of Lufia halts Gades attack. Lufia joins the warrior and it is revealed that Gades was only the first to be revived, and the other three will soon arrive to terrorize the world.

They are joined by another warrior, Aguro, and set out to find the remaining members of Maxim's old party. However, Guy is now too old, and he dies at the shock of the Sinistrals return. Artea still lives, however he is more accepting of his advanced years despite his elven blood, and hands down his old bow to Jerin, an elf girl who joined the new party on their quest and a rival for the warrior's affection.

The party sets out to find the Dual Blade, the sword Maxim used in the first war, not knowing that it was originally created by the Sinistrals. They find their old fortress below sea level, where Amon and Daos are encountered. They reveal that their sister Erin was already revived 30 years prior to the current war, and later as part of their trap the Dual Blade reacts on its own and affects Lufia, and revives her true identity as Erin herself. She joins the Sinistrals in the rising Fortress of Doom.

The warrior and the remaining party set out to defeat them, infiltrating the Fortress, as did Maxim those years ago. Gades, Amon, and Daos are defeated, and Erin is swayed back as Lufia when her brother Sinistrals fuse to become a final monstrous entity. The party prevails, though Lufia elects to remain behind as the Fortress falls again.

Peace reigns once more, though the Warrior is distraught over the loss of Lufia, until one day she returns to him, having no memory of her past life as either Erin or Lufia. The red-headed descendant of Maxim elects to stay with her, and help her to live her new life.

== Characters ==
=== Playable characters ===
- "The Hero" is the primary character of the story that the player gets to name. He grew up in a small town of Alekia and was raised by a man named Roman, a friend of his father (who had died in a battle long ago). Very skilled in swordplay, The Hero prefers to fight in close quarters, and wears heavy armor, though he does have some degree of magical skill, usually healing and defense spells. He is said to be a descendant of the great hero Maxim who vanquished the Sinistrals and saved the world.
- Lufia is the Hero's best friend whom he has known since childhood. She is bossy, but proficient in spellcasting. She has a romantic interest in The Hero and helps him in any way she can. She fights with wands and other lightweight weapons such as flails and even frying pans. Lufia utilizes Thunder, Water and Explosion magic as well as numerous support spells.
- Aguro is the leader of the army of the nation of Lorbenia. He is a hardened warrior who is interested in the Hero's fighting ability. Having no skill in magic, he instead relies on his brute strength and skill with swords, axes and lances. He, like the Hero, can equip heavy armor to increase his defense.
- Jerin is a half-elf who, because of her heritage, has an increased lifespan and actually appears younger than she is. Agile, and good with magic, Jerin prefers to fight at a distance, using either a bow and arrow or wands in combat. She is proficient with Fire and Ice magic and is a master of healing.

Battle mode

=== Starting characters ===
At the start of the game (introduction):

- Maxim is the original leader of the group who went after the Sinistrals years ago his name and his descendants went down in legend.
- Selan is Maxim's wife and a powerful magic user but is not as strong with melee attacks.
- Guy is a longtime friend of Maxim who has no knowledge of magic himself but is physically the most powerful character.
- Artea is an elf who can attack all targets with his bow and has a decent amount of magic. Artea lives through both comings of the Sinistrals due to the long lifespan of an elf.

=== Antagonists ===
- The Sinistrals are a group of four powerful, god-like warriors who plan on taking over the world. From their floating Fortress of Doom, they gathered their strength, only to be defeated by Maxim and his friends years ago. Their ranks include Gades, Master of Destruction, an overbearing and proud warrior clad in dark armor; Amon, Master of Chaos, a resourceful man who wears gold armor and wields a trident; Erim, Mistress of Death, who can revive any of her brothers if they fall in combat; and Daos, Master of Terror, their leader, an incredibly powerful sorcerer. Due to a mistake, however, in the English version Daos and Amon have their titles reversed. Daos is the Master of Chaos (Infernos in the Dutch version), while Amon is the Master of Terror; this is the only game in the series where this localization error occurs.

== Development ==
Taito began to develop a port of Lufia & the Fortress of Doom for the Sega Mega Drive/Genesis, but the game, primarily intended for a North American release, was not released because of Taito America's closure in 1995. At least two full-page advertisements were made in U.S. magazines, the second one announcing a delay to spring 1995, with the tagline "It's worth the wait". A ROM image of the Mega Drive version was leaked online in 2014 by a former programmer of the port.

== Reception ==
Reception

Review scores
Publication	Score
Dragon	3 of 5
Electronic Gaming Monthly	7.8 of 10
Famitsu	28 of 40
Game Players	9 of 10
GamePro	4.5 of 5
Hyper	79%
Nintendo Power	3.5 of 5
RPGFan	86%
Electronic Games	93%

In the United States, it was the top-selling Super NES game in February 1994.

Upon release, Electronic Games scored it 93%, calling it "the best RPG so far this year". In Dragon, Sandy Petersen gave the game 3 out of 5 stars. GamePro gave it ratings of 4.5/5 for graphics, 4/5 for sound, 4/5 for control and 4.5/5 for overall fun factor. Lufia was runner-up for GamePro's 1993 Role-Playing Game of the Year award, which was won by Secret of Mana.

Retrospectively, the game has received positive to mixed reviews. Some reflect on it fondly for its story and characters, while others criticize it as being inferior to other console RPGs of that era, such as Secret of Mana, the Final Fantasy titles, or its prequel Lufia II: Rise of the Sinistrals.

== Sources ==
- "Lufia & the Fortress of Doom Turns Ten". Forfeit Island. 2003. Last accessed May 9, 2005.
