= Srđan Maksimović =

Serbian-Swiss footballer (born 1986)

Srdjan Maksimović
Personal information
- Full name: Srđan Maksimović
- Date of birth: 13 December 1986 (age 39)
- Place of birth: Baden, Switzerland
- Height: 1.78 m (5 ft 10 in)
- Position: Attacking midfielder

Youth career
- Red Star Belgrade
- Jedinstvo Ub
- 2004-2005: Young Boys

Senior career*
Years	Team	Apps	(Gls)
2005–2006	Rad	1	(0)
2006–2007	Radnički Pirot	9	(0)
2007–2008	Sevojno		
2009	Fislisbach		
2010–2011	Wettingen II		
2012–2015	Industrie Turicum		

International career
- Switzerland U19
- * Club domestic league appearances and goals

Srđan Maksimović (born 13 December 1986) is a Serbian-Swiss professional football player. He usually plays as attacking right or central midfielder.

== Club career ==
He came to Swiss Super League club BSC Young Boys in 2004 from the youth teams of the Serbian giants FK Crvena Zvezda, but he stayed only one season. Next he came back to Serbia where he signed with the Serbian Superliga club FK Rad. After one season, the club was relegated to the Serbian First League, the second tier in Serbia, and then he moved to another same level club in the winter break, FK Radnički Pirot, where he played until the end of that season. Next, he signed with another rising Serbian club, FK Sevojno from the town of Užice.

== International career ==
He has played over 50 matches for the youth Switzerland national teams, beginning with the under-14 until the under-19.
