= Maximum (disambiguation) =

The maximum is an extreme value in a set.

Maximum may also refer to:

- Maximum (MAX album)
- Maximum (Murat Boz album)
- "Maximum" (song), a song by Murat Boz
- Maximum (character), a fictional superhero published by DC Comics
- Maximum break in snooker is often known as maximum
- The general maximum, an economic policy in the French Revolution
- Maximum (film), a 2012 Bollywood movie

== See also ==
- Maxima (disambiguation)
- Maximization (disambiguation)
- Maximus (disambiguation)
- Minimum
