= SilencerCo Maxim 50 =

- Type: Muzzle-loading rifle
- Place of origin: United States of America

Production history
- Manufacturer: SilencerCo
- Unit cost: $999 (MSRP)
- Produced: Since 2017

Specifications
- Length: 45 in (110 cm)
- Barrel length: 20 in (51 cm)
- Caliber: .50
- Action: Muzzle loaded
- Feed system: Single shot

The SilencerCo Maxim 50 is a .50 caliber muzzle-loading rifle with an integrated sound suppressor, which is a Traditions Vortek Strikerfire with a SilencerCo suppressor welded onto the end of a shortened barrel. As a muzzleloader, the rifle is not considered a firearm under the Gun Control Act of 1968; and the integrated suppressor is exempt from the US National Firearms Act because it is permanently attached to the rifle. When fired, the rifle has a report of 139.9 decibels.

The firearm does not have iron sights, so requires a telescopic sight. The recoil is reported to be less than for a non-suppressed .50 caliber in-line rifle.
