= Ivan Maksymenko =

Ukrainian botanist (1907–1976)

- Born: Ivan Kyrylovych Maksymenko; February 23, 1907; Mykhailivka, Cherkassy uezd, Kiev Governorate, Russian Empire
- Died: May 31, 1976 (aged 69); Kyiv, Ukrainian SSR, Soviet Union
- Children: 1
- Awards: Hero of Socialist Labour; Order of Lenin; Order of the Red Banner of Labour (3x)
- Scientific career
- Fields: Geneticist

Ivan Kyrylovych Maksymenko (Ukrainian: Іван Кирилович Максименко; 23 February 1907 – 31 May 1976) was a Soviet and Ukrainian geneticist, doctor of biological sciences, professor, member of the Academy of Sciences of the Turkmen SSR (since 1959), and a Hero of Socialist Labour (1965).

== Biography ==
He was born on February 23, 1907, in the village of Mykhailivka (now Cherkasy Raion of Cherkasy Oblast). He received his primary education in Ukraine, then studied in Tashkent, and worked in Turkmen SSR.

== Scientific activities ==
His main areas of scientific research were selection and seed production of cotton. He revealed the patterns of hereditary change of cotton plants in remote hybridization and developed methods to accelerate the selection process. For the first time in the USSR, he bred varieties of cotton with naturally dyed fiber, which was a strategic raw material during the German-Soviet war (camouflage made of natural brown and green cotton was not recognizable from the air). He created valuable varieties of fine-fibrous cotton.

== Distinctions ==
- Honored Science Worker of the Turkmen SSR
- Honored Agronomist of the Turkmen SSR
- Hero of Socialist Labour (1965) – for high achievements in breeding new varieties of cotton
- Three Orders of the Red Banner of Labour
- Two Orders of the Badge of Honour

== Memorial ==
In recent years he lived and died in Kyiv. His tomb is at Baikove Cemetery (plot No. 33).
