= Ivan Pavlovich Maksimovich =

- Born: 1864; Siret, Austrian Empire (now Romania)
- Died: 4 January 1931 (aged 66–67); Chernivtsi, Romania (now Ukraine)
- Military career
- Branch: UGA
- Rank: Colonel
- Conflicts: World War I; Polish - Ukrainian War
- Awards: Order of the Iron Crown; Military Merit Cross; Military Merit Medal

Ivan Pavlovich Maksimovich (Ukrainian: Іван Павлович Максимович) (1864 - May 4, 1931) was a Ukrainian colonel of the UGA.

== Biography ==
=== Early life ===
He was born in the city of Siret in the Austrian Empire (now in Romania) in the family of Pavel Maksymovych, assistant adviser to the county court in Siret, later adviser-secretary of the regional court in Chernivtsi, and a founding member of the Supreme Ruthenian Council in Lviv in 1848. He was a grandson of the honorary canon, Greek Catholic dean and pastor in Chernivtsi Teodor Maksymovych, nephew of Ivan Maksymovych, staff officer of the 51st Hungarian Infantry Regiment, hero of the Battle of Koeniggrätz, "sincere Ruthenian patriot and member of the Chernivtsi Ruthenian societies." (Note: from his 1894 obituary)

He studied at the Higher Real Gymnasium in Chernivtsi. An ethnic Ukrainian, he entered the service in the Austro-Hungarian Army.

=== Military career ===
Initially, he was a soldier of the 89th Infantry Regiment. He was appointed a cadet in the infantry corps on September 1, 1883, then promoted to the rank of second lieutenant on May 1, 1887, lieutenant on November 1, 1890, captain of the 2nd class on November 1, 1898, captain of the 1st class on November 1, 1898, major on November 1, 1910. From around 1883, he served in the 80th Infantry Regiment in Lviv for many years. Around 1886-1887 he was a deputy officer, then he served as an officer, around 1889/1890 he was a battalion adjutant, and then he remained in the unit for the next years until around 1911.

He was then transferred to the 41st Bukovina infantry regiment in Chernivtsi, where from around 1911 he was the commander of the 1st battalion, from around 1912 he was the commander of the spare battalion, from around 1913/1914 again the commander of the 1st battalion. Maksimovich was promoted to lieutenant colonel of infantry on May 1, 1914. After the outbreak of World War I in 1914, he remained an officer of the 41st regiment. He was promoted to the rank of infantry colonel on May 1, 1916. In May 1916 he was transferred from 41st regiment to the 57th Infantry regiment where he remained until 1917. He retired in November 1917.

In the autumn of 1918 he commanded a garrison in Sanok, whose personnel consisted of soldiers of the 54th Moravian Infantry Regiment, stationed before the war in Sarajevo.

With the beginning of World War I he took part in hostilities as a staff officer of the 41st Infantry Regiment. For brave and successful behavior in front of the enemy in December 1914 he was named a knight of the Order of the Iron Crown of the 3rd class with military decorations. He was awarded a medal for military service on the red flag, a distinction for military service for officers of the 3rd class, a bronze jubilee medal for the armed forces, a military jubilee cross, the Order of the Iron Crown of the 3rd class, a cross for military service, a German iron cross of the 2nd class, many other Austrian and German military honors.

After the collapse of the Austro-Hungarian monarchy he enlisted in the Ukrainian army as a colonel of the UGA. On November 1, 1918, he refused to comply with the demands of a delegation of Polish activists from the town of Sanok regarding the disarmament of the city's garrison and the transfer of its barracks to the Poles. During the meeting, pressure on the colonel was also exerted by Czech soldiers of the 54th regiment, who took the Polish side. He served in the headquarters of the UGA, from 19 September 1919 he was appointed inspector of all stage formations and institutions in the field of the UGA army and corps. As part of A. Kravs' group, he took part in the march of the Ukrainian armies to the cities of Kyiv and Odesa. At the end of April 1920 he was interned by the Poles. Together with other interned Galician officers, he was included as a colonel in the reserve brigade in the 5th Kherson Division of the DA of the Ukrainian People's Republic. In August 1920, he left the active army of the Ukrainian People's Republic, moved to the western side of the Carpathians and was interned in Liberec. He was the initiator and chairman of the American Red Cross Aid Committee.

He later lived in Chernivtsi, where he died and is buried in the Ruthenian cemetery. A mass funeral took place on May 6, 1931 from the cemetery chapel to the grave in sector № 70 with the participation of all riflemen and UGA officers who lived in Chernivtsi at that time.

== Decorations ==
- Order of the Iron Crown (1915)
- Military Merit Cross (1916)
- Military Merit Cross (1909)
- Military Merit Medal (1904)
- 3rd Class Badge for Military Service (before 1908)
- 2nd Class Badge for Military Service (before 1917)
- Bronze Commemorative Medal for the Armed Forces and Gendarmerie (before 1900)
- Military Jubilee Cross (before 1909)
- Bosnian-Herzegovina Commemorative Medal (before 1910)
- Commemorative Cross of Mobilization 1912-1913 (before 1914)

== Bibliography ==
- Pytel, Adam [in Polish] (1920). "Dear friends!". Sprawozdanie Polskiego Towarzystwa Gimnastycznego "Sokół" w Sanoku za lata 1914., 1915., 1916., 1917., 1918. i 1919. pp. 3–11 – via Sanok.
- Zielecki, Alojzy (1995). "W epoce autonomii galicyjskiej. Miasto w latach Wielkiej Wojny 1914–1918" [In the era of Galician autonomy: The city during the Great War 1914–1918]. In Feliks Kiryk (ed.). Sanok. Dzieje miasta [Sanok: The history of the city] (in Polish). Kraków: Secesja. pp. 481–498. ISBN 83-86077-57-3.
