= Lufia II: Rise of the Sinistrals =

1995 video game

- North American box art
- Developer: Neverland
- Publishers: JP: Taito; NA: Natsume Inc.; PAL: Nintendo
- Director: Masahide Miyata
- Designers: Ryu Kurugami; Tomonari Matsumoto; Samichi Sugiura
- Programmer: Akihiro Suzuki
- Writer: Masahide Miyata
- Composer: Yasunori Shiono
- Series: Lufia
- Platform: Super NES
- Release: JP: February 24, 1995; NA: September 1996; PAL: 1997
- Genre: Role-playing
- Mode: Single-player

Lufia II: Rise of the Sinistrals, known as Estpolis Denki II (エストポリス伝記II, Esutoporisu Denki II; officially translated Biography of Estpolis II) in Japan, and as Lufia in Europe and Australia, is a role-playing video game with puzzle elements developed by Neverland and published in Japan in 1995 by Taito, and in North America and Europe in 1996 by Natsume and Nintendo respectively, for the Super Nintendo Entertainment System. It is the second game in the Lufia series.

The game is a prequel to Lufia & the Fortress of Doom. It follows the story of the first main character's ancestor, Maxim, and explains the origins of the war between mankind and a group of gods called the Sinistrals. Lufia II made a number of changes from the first game. Dungeons no longer have random encounters and there are hundreds of puzzles throughout the game, ranging from simple to extremely challenging. It also introduced new skills, such as a variety of weapons that could be used to stun monsters or solve puzzles, and IP attacks. In 2010, Square Enix released a re-imagining of the original game titled Lufia: Curse of the Sinistrals.

== Gameplay ==
Characters walk around an overworld map and then enter dungeons, where they fight monsters and either buy or find new equipment and spells. The player's party supports up to four characters at once, along with a Capsule Monster. There are various forms of transportation faster than walking, including a warping spell, a boat modified into a submarine, and a blimp. The game includes the casino minigames Pachinko Slot, Black Jack, Slot Machine, Stud Poker, and Action Bingo.

In dungeons, monsters appear on the map, and can be avoided if the player wishes. Motion in dungeons is also turn-based, and monsters do not move unless the player does. The main player character, Maxim, gains a number of tools and weapons which can only be used in dungeons (similar to The Legend of Zelda titles), such as a bow and arrow, bombs and a hookshot. These, along with his sword, stun monsters temporarily and interact with obstacles. Dungeons place great emphasis on puzzles. On the world map, monsters are encountered randomly.

Aside from the RPG standards of "Fight", "Use Item" and "Use Magic", characters have access to IP Skills, which are attached to weapons, armor and accessories. Each character's IP bar fills when taking damage, and IP Skills deplete varying amounts of charge when activated. Players can freely equip and customize their characters with sets of these weapons and armor for different IP skill effects, and apply them while utilizing tactics during battles. IP Skills themselves cannot be customized, sometimes forcing the player to choose between a newer and stronger piece of gear, or an older, weaker one that has a useful IP Skill.

Capsule monsters are special creatures which the player may only find on specific locations of the world. Once a Capsule monster is found, the party acquires a fifth, computer controlled member. These monsters can be fed items and equipment, and once they are satiated they evolve to a different form, up to a fifth and definitive form, labeled M. Seven of them exist, and each Capsule monster belongs to a different element (Neutral, Light, Wind, Water, Dark, Fire and Soil), and has a different set of skills.

The Ancient Cave, a randomly generated dungeon composed of 99 floors, is presented to the player as a side-quest in the town of Gruberik. Every time the player enters the cave, a new layout is generated, similar to the roguelike genre. Within the cave, the characters are downgraded to zero experience points and stripped of nearly all equipment and items. The player must proceed through the cave's floors, collecting equipment, finding magic spells and increasing levels, with the objective of reaching the Ancient Cave's final floor. There are three ways of exiting the cave: by dying, by reaching its bottom, and by finding and using an item exclusive to the cave, named "providence". Within the cave lie two kinds of chests, blue and red. Red chests contain items which can only be used inside the cave for the duration of the playing session. As soon as the player leaves the cave, all items from red chests disappear, except for "Iris Treasures", which cannot be equipped and serve only as collectibles. The bottom floor of the inn in Gruberik serves as a storage for these items. The rare blue chests contains items which can be used outside the cave and brought back to the cave on subsequent journeys. Some items that can be found in blue chests can also be found by other means, such as monster drops. These can also be taken in and out of the Ancient Cave just as if they were found in blue chests.

== Plot ==
The game is a prequel, set 99 years before Lufia & the Fortress of Doom, and tells the story of how the Sinistrals first appeared in the world and the battles fought against them. The story is centered around the hero Maxim, a swordsman from the town of Elcid who is born with a natural ability to fight and is destined to destroy the Sinistrals. Throughout his journey, he meets other warriors who are able to confront the Sinistrals as well.

=== Characters ===
The game's protagonist is Maxim, a talented swordsman from the town of Elcid. Little about his past is mentioned in the game, but the story begins when a mysterious woman named Iris tells him that he is to go on a journey.

Throughout the game, Maxim is joined by other talented warriors or 'Heroes of Legend' such as Tia, his childhood friend, who has a romantic interest in Maxim; Guy, a wandering warrior who joins Maxim after he rescued his sister; Dekar, the powerful bodyguard of Prince Alex of Bound Kingdom; Lexis, a brilliant inventor; Artea, an elven bowman; and Selan, commander of the Parcelyte army who becomes Maxim's wife in mid-story.

The game's antagonists are the Sinistrals, a group of four godlike beings bent on world domination. They are led by Daos, the Sinistral of Terror, who seeks an ultimate weapon to use against the people of the world. His three subordinates are Gades, the Sinistral of Destruction, who is credited with the destruction of two entire cities; Amon, the Sinistral of Chaos, who is known to be a brilliant tactician; and Erim, the Sinistral of Death.

== Release ==
The North American release of the game was initially slated for release in May 1996, but did not actually hit store shelves until around September. It has a few graphical and textual glitches which were corrected in the European version. The European versions were released in English, German, Spanish and Dutch for distribution in Australia, Germany, Spain and the Netherlands respectively. The Australian version was released in 1997, one year after the North American version. Both the European and Australian releases of the game were titled "Lufia", not "Lufia II", and included no subtitle because Lufia & the Fortress of Doom was never released in Europe and Australia.

== Reception ==
Reception

Aggregate score
Aggregator	Score
GameRankings	80%

Review scores
Publication	Score
Famitsu	30/40; 10/10
GameFan	270/300
Nintendo Life	9/10
RPGamer	4/5
RPGFan	85%

The game held an aggregate review score of 80% on GameRankings based on five reviews. Upon release in Japan, Famitsu gave the game a score of 30 out of 40, while it received a perfect score of 10 out of 10 in their Reader Cross Review. In Japanese polls of all-time favorite Super Famicom games, Lufia II was consistently voted one of the top five between 1995 and 1996. The game sold 60,254 cartridges in Japan.

Upon release in North America, three GameFan reviewers each scored it 90 out of 100; all three praised the storyline, puzzles, dungeons, graphics, and soundtrack. GamePro praised the game's heavy puzzle element, but criticized that the battles are easy, the graphics are subpar, and the music and sound effects are boringly generic. He concluded that the game is unexceptional, and in particular pales against the recently released Super Mario RPG, but makes a decent holdover for gamers waiting for the next great RPG.

Retrospectively, Corbie Dillard of Nintendo Life praised the "unique visual stylings, the efficient turn-based combat system and the beautifully orchestrated soundtrack", and called it one of the best RPG games for Super Nintendo console. IGN ranked Lufia II: Rise of the Sinistrals 34th on their "Top 100 SNES Games of All Time".

== Nintendo DS remake ==
An action-RPG remake of Lufia II for the Nintendo DS was developed by Neverland, with much of the staff of Lufia II involved in the project, and released in 2010. As in the original game, it features dungeons that focus heavily on puzzle-solving, but unlike the original, the gameplay is now oriented towards action, with the player controlling Maxim directly in battle and switching between characters by tapping his or her portrait on the bottom screen. The story also differs heavily in many points and received several additions.
