= Patriarch (disambiguation) =

A patriarch is a high-ranking bishop in certain Catholic and Orthodox churches.

Patriarch may also refer to:

- Patriarch (Buddhism), a historic teacher who transferred the teachings
- Patriarch (Latter Day Saints), the Melchizedek Priesthood office in the Church of Jesus Christ of Latter-Day Saints
- Patriarch (magazine), a defunct American magazine that espoused Biblical patriarchy
- Patriarchs (Bible), prominent figures in the Hebrew scriptures, especially Abraham, Isaac and Jacob
- A male ruler (of a tribe, family, etc.) in a traditional patriarchy
- Patriarch, the sailing ship used to transport the Whitbread Engine
- A character in the video game Killing Floor
- "The Patriarchs" (poem), poem by Simon Armitage on the death of Prince Philip, Duke of Edinburgh

== See also ==
- Matriarch
- Patriarchate, the see and jurisdiction of an ecclesiastical Patriarch
- Patriarchalism, a seventeenth-century political theory of absolute monarchy in England
- Nasi or Patriarch of the Jews, the head of the Sanhedrin of Israel from 191 BCE to 425 CE
- Pater familias, the head of a Roman family.
- Supreme Patriarch or Sangharaja, a title given to senior Theravada Buddhist monks
