= Maximus =

Maximus (Hellenised as Maximos) is the Latin term for "greatest" or "largest". In this connection it may refer to:

- Circus Maximus (disambiguation)
- Pontifex maximus, the highest priest of the College of Pontiffs in ancient Rome

== People ==
=== Roman historical figures ===
- Quintus Fabius Maximus Rullianus, magister equitum in 325 or 324, consul in 322, 310, 308, 297, and 295 BC, dictator in 315 and censor in 304, princeps senatus; triumphed in 322, 309, and 295.
- Quintus Fabius Maximus Verrucosus (c. 280 – 203 BC), surnamed Cunctator, "the delayer"
- Magnus Maximus, Roman emperor from 383 to 388
- Maximus of Moesia (fl. 89–117), twice consul
- Maximus of Hispania (409–411), Roman usurper
- Petronius Maximus (396–455), Western Roman Emperor for two and a half months in 455

=== Authors and philosophers ===
- Valerius Maximus, 1st-century historian
- Claudius Maximus, 2nd-century Stoic, teacher of emperor Marcus Aurelius
- Maximus of Tyre, 2nd-century Greek philosopher and rhetorician
- Maximus of Ephesus (died 372), 4th-century philosopher, preceptor of emperor Julian
- Ibn Arabi (1165–1240), Muslim mystic and philosopher, called Doctor Maximus
- Maximus Planudes (c. 1260 – c. 1305), Greek Orthodox monk, anthologist, translator, and theologian
- Maximos of Gallipoli (died 1633), Greek Orthodox monk and translator of the New Testament into modern Greek

=== Christian saints ===
- Maximus of Aveia (died c. 250), also known as Maximus of Aquila
- Maximus of Rome (died 250), martyr
- Tiburtius, Valerian, and Maximus (died 3rd century), martyrs at Rome
- Maximus III of Jerusalem (died c. 350), bishop of Jerusalem c. 333 – c. 350
- Maximus of Naples (died 361), bishop of Naples
- Maximus and Domatius (died 380), monks
- Maximus of Évreux (died c. 384), bishop of Évreux
- Maximus of Lérins (433–460), bishop of Riez and second abbot of Lérins Abbey
- Maximus of Turin (died 465), bishop of Turin
- Maximus of Mainz (died 5th century), bishop of Mogontiacum (Mainz)
- Maximus of Pavia (died 511), bishop of Pavia
- Maximus the Confessor (580–662), theologian and monk
- Maximos, Metropolitan of Kiev (died 1305), Metropolitan of Kiev 1283–1305
- Maximos of Kafsokalyvia (died 1365 or 1380), hesychast monk on Mount Athos
- Maximus III of Constantinople (died 1482), Patriarch of Constantinople 1476–1482
- Maximus of Serbia (1461–1516), born Đorđe Branković, Serbian despot and archbishop
- Maximus the Greek (1475–1556), translator and monk in Russia

=== Christian bishops and patriarchs ===
- Maximus I of Jerusalem, an early bishop of Jerusalem c. 170
- Maximus I of Antioch, bishop of Antioch 182–191
- Maximus II of Jerusalem, bishop of Jerusalem c. 185 – c. 196
- Maximus I of Constantinople (died 380), also known as Maximus the Cynic, archbishop of Constantinople in 380, opponent of Gregory of Nazianzus
- Maximus II of Antioch, Patriarch of Antioch 449–455
- Maximus (bishop of Zaragoza) (fl. 592–619), bishop of Zaragoza
- Maximus (bishop of Ceneda) (fl. 741 – c. 790), bishop of Ceneda
- Maximus II of Constantinople (died 1216), Patriarch of Constantinople in 1216
- Maximus IV of Constantinople, Patriarch of Constantinople 1491–1497
- Maximos Margunios (1549–1602), Greek Orthodox bishop of Cerigo (Kythira)
- Maximus V of Constantinople (1897–1972), Patriarch of Constantinople 1946–1948

=== Fictional characters ===
- Antillar Maximus, a character in Jim Butcher's Codex Alera series
- Flattus Maximus, lead guitarist of heavy metal act GWAR
- Fortress Maximus, a giant Autobot from the Transformers franchise
- Maximus, a supporting character, the name of a horse in Disney's Tangled
- Maximus (comics), a Marvel Comics villain who frequently opposes the Fantastic Four and the Royal Family of the Inhumans
- Maximus Decimus Meridius, the main character in Ridley Scott's film, Gladiator
- Maximus Mayhem, an antagonist from the animated show M.A.S.K. (TV series)
- Maximus Musicus, the main character of a musical educational franchise of the same name
- Maximus "Max" Zamfirescu, a character in the 1998 movie My Giant

=== Sportspeople ===
- Maximus Hall (born 2007), British racing driver
- Maximus Jones (born 2004), Thai tennis player
- Maximus Tainio (born 2001), Finnish football player
- Maximus Wanner (born 2003), Canadian ice hockey player
- Maximus Williamson (born 2006), American swimmer

== Other ==
- Gluteus maximus muscle, the largest and most superficial of the three gluteal muscles
- Maximos Mansion, the official residence of the Prime Minister of Greece
- Maximus, a 2013 album by King James
- Maximus (BBS), a bulletin board system originally developed by Scott J. Dudley
- Maximus Inc., a publicly traded international corporation based in Tysons Corner, Virginia
- Maximus (racing yacht), a racing yacht built in 2005
- Optimus Maximus keyboard

== See also ==
- Maxim (disambiguation)
- Maxima (disambiguation)
- Maximo (disambiguation)
- Maximum (disambiguation)
- Maxime
- Massimo
