= Maximilian =

- Pronunciation: /ˌmæksɪˈmɪliən/ German: [maksiˈmiːli̯aːn] Polish: [maksɨˈmʲilʲjan]
- Gender: Male

Origin
- Origin: Latin

Other names
- Related names: Maximiliano, Massimiliano, Maximus, Maxim, Max, Maxie

Maximilian or Maximillian (Maximiliaan in Dutch and Maximilien in French) is a male name.

The name "Max" is considered a shortening of "Maximilian" as well as of several other names, including but not limited to Maxwell.

== List of people ==
=== Monarchs ===
- Maximilian I, Holy Roman Emperor (1459–1519)
- Maximilian II, Holy Roman Emperor (1527–1576)
- Maximilian I, Elector of Bavaria (1573–1651)
- Maximilian II Emanuel, Elector of Bavaria (1662–1726)
- Maximilian III Joseph, Elector of Bavaria (1727–1777)
- Maximilian I Joseph of Bavaria (1756–1825)
- Maximilian II of Bavaria (1811–1864)
- Prince Maximilian of Baden (1867–1929)
- Duke Maximilian Joseph in Bavaria (1808–1888)
- Maximilian I of Mexico (1832–1867)

=== Other royalty ===
- Maximilian, Hereditary Prince of Saxony (1759–1838)
- Maximilian, Margrave of Baden (1933–2022)

=== Saints ===
- Maximilian of Lorch (died 288), Roman bishop, missionary and martyr
- Maximilian of Tebessa (274–295), Roman martyr
- Maximilian of Antioch (died c. 353), Christian martyr
- Maximilian Kolbe (1894–1941), Polish Conventual Franciscan friar and martyr

=== Sportspeople ===
- Max Aarons (born 2000), English footballer
- Maximilian Abel (born 1982), professional tennis player from Germany
- Maximilian Ahlschwede (born 1990), German former professional footballer
- Maximilian Arfsten (born 2001), American professional soccer player
- Maximilian Arndt (born 1987), German bobsledder
- Maximilian Arnold (born 1994), German professional footballer
- Maximilian "Max" Baer (Maximilian Adelbert Baer), (1909–1959), American boxer and heavyweight champion
- Maximilian Bauer, multiple people
- Maximilian Beier (born 2002), German professional footballer
- Maximilian Beister (born 1990), German footballer
- Maximilian Benassi, Italian sprint canoeist
- Maximilian Beyer (born 1993), German racing cyclist
- Maximilian Brandl (born 1997), German cross-country mountain biker
- Maximilian Braune (born 2003), German professional footballer
- Maximilian Breunig (born 2000), German professional footballer
- Maximilian Buhk (born 1992), retired German racing driver
- Maximilian "Max" Chilton (born 1991), Indycar driver
- Maximilian Dallinger (born 1996), German sport shooter
- Maximilian Dietz (born 2002), American professional soccer player
- Maximilian Dimitrovici (born 1989), German ice hockey player
- Maximilian Dittgen (born 1995), German professional footballer
- Maximilian Dörnbach (born 1995), German track cyclist
- Maximilien Drion (born 1997), Belgian ski mountaineer
- Maximilian Drum (born 1991), German footballer
- Maximilian Eggestein (born 1996), German professional footballer
- Maximilian Engl (born 1997), German professional footballer
- Maximilian Entrup (born 1997), Austrian professional footballer
- Maximilian Ferrari (born 2000), Canadian soccer player
- Maximilian Forster (born 1990), German professional ice hockey player
- Maximilian Jäger (born 2000), German para-cyclist
- Maximilian Heidegger (born 1997), American-Israeli basketball player in the Israeli Basketball Premier League
- Maximilian Günther (born 1997), German Formula E driver
- Maximilian Levy (born 1987), German track cyclist
- Maximilian Maeder (born 2006), Singaporean kitesurfer
- Maximilian Mang (born 2000), German-American football player
- Maximilian Mbaeva (born 1989), Namibian footballer
- Maximilian Senft (born 1989), Austrian football manager, former footballer, and poker player
- Maximillian "Max" Schmeling (1905–2005), German boxer and heavyweight champion
- Max Emilian Verstappen (born 1997), Formula 1 driver and four time world champion

=== Academics and scholars ===
- Maximilian Balzan (1637–1711), Maltese mediaeval philosopher who specialised mainly in physics and art
- Maximilian Berlitz (1852–1921), linguist and founder of the Berlitz Language Schools
- Maximilian Bircher-Benner (1867–1939), Swiss physician and pioneer nutritionist
- Maximilian Braun (1850–1930), German anatomist and zoologist who specialized in the field of parasitology
- Maximilian Consbruch (1866–1927), German West Prussian classical philologist and gymnasium principal, known for his studies of Greek lyric and the work of Hephaestion
- Maximilian Curtze (1837–1903), German mathematician and historian of mathematics
- Maximilian Fichtner (born 1961), professor for Solid State Chemistry at the Ulm University and executive director of the Helmholtz Institute Ulm for Electrochemical Energy Storage (HIU)
- Maximilian Fischer (1929–2019), Austrian entomologist and a specialist on parasitic wasps
- Maximilian Forte, professor of anthropology at the Concordia University Department of Sociology and Anthropology in Montreal, Quebec, Canada
- Maximilian Hacman (1877–1961), Romanian academic
- Maximilian Emil Hehl (1861–1916), German engineer and architect active in Brazil
- Maximilian Nitze (1848–1906), German urologist
- Max C. Starkloff (1858–1942), American physician and Health Commissioner for St. Louis, Missouri
- Max Weber (1864–1920), German sociologist, historian, jurist, political economist
- Maximilian Ferdinand Wocke (1820–1906), German entomologist

=== Arts ===
- Maximilian Arland (born 1981), German television presenter and singer
- Max Baer Jr. (Maximilian Adalbert Baer Jr, born 1937), American actor, screenwriter, producer, and director
- Maximilian Bern (1849–1923), German writer and editor
- Maximilien "Max" Boublil (born 1979), French actor and singer
- Maximillian "Max" Brooks (born 1972), American author
- Maximilian Brückner (born 1979), German actor
- Maximilian Cercha (1818–1907), Polish painter and drawer
- Maximilian Colt, Flemish sculptor who settled in England and eventually rose to become the King's Master Carver
- Maximilian (1936–2020), stage name of American musician Maxfield Crook
- Maximilian Dasio (1865–1954), German painter and medal engraver
- Maximilian Davis (born 1995), British fashion designer
- Maximilian Dimoff (born 1968), principal bassist of the Cleveland Orchestra
- Maximilian C. Jehuda Ewert (born 1974), composer and violinist
- Maximilian Schell (1930–2014), Austrian-born Swiss actor
- Maximilian von Sevenborg (c. 1490 – c. 1538), author

=== Other people ===
- Maximilian Aichern (1932–2026), Austrian Roman Catholic bishop
- Maximilian Apfelbaum (d. 1953), Polish-born furrier who co-founded the New York furriers Maximilian
- Maximilian Bathon (born 1991), German politician
- Maximilian Böltl (born 1983), German politician
- Maximilian F. Bonzano (1821–1894), German-born American government official, politician, and physician
- Maximilian Büsser, Swiss businessman and founder of the watch brand MB&F
- Maximilian Dood (born 1983), American YouTuber and Twitch streamer
- Max Fosh (born 1995), British YouTuber and comedian
- Maximilian Gludau (born 1998), German politician
- Maximilian Grabner (1905–1948), Austrian Nazi Gestapo chief in Auschwitz executed for crimes against humanity
- Maximilian von Jaunez (1873–1947), French-German industrialist and politician
- Maximilian List (1910 – c. 1980), German SS concentration camp commandant
- Maximilian Menton (born 1995), German politician
- Maximilien Robespierre (1758–1794), politician in the French Revolution
- Maximilian Ronge (1874–1953), Austrian intelligence officer
- Maximilian Schimmel (born 1989), German politician
- Maximilian Schirmer (born 1990), German politician
- Maximilian Schröter (born 1994), German politician
- Maximilian von Weichs (1881–1954), German field marshal

=== Fictional characters ===
- Maximillian, robot from the 1979 Disney motion picture The Black Hole
- Maximillian Arturo, a character from the television series Sliders
- Maximillian Papandrious, the Greek student in Mind Your Language, played by Kevork Malikyan
- Maximilian Jenius, fictional character from Macross
- Maximillion Pegasus, fictional character on Yu-Gi-Oh!
- Maximilian Veers, Imperial general who led the assault on Echo Base in The Empire Strikes Back
- Maximilian (Maxie) Zeus, villain in Batman comic book series
- Tsar Maximilian, hero of the eponymous Russian folk-play

== See also ==
- Massimiliano
- Maximilian, award-winning New York furriers founded around 1942
- Maximiliano
- Maximilla
- Maximillion
