= Maximiliano =

- Pronunciation: Spanish: [maksimiˈljano]
- Gender: Male

Origin
- Origin: Spanish
- Region of origin: Spain, Latin America

Other names
- Related names: Maximilian, Maximus, Max

Maximiliano is a masculine name of Iberian origin, with its original derivation from the Latin word "maximum", which literally translates to "greatest". In fact, as a byproduct of imperialism, the name has become very common in Latin America and rivals that of its notability in the Iberian Peninsula.

Notable people with the name include:

- Maximiliano Alaníz (born 1990), Argentine footballer
- Maximiliano Araújo (born 2000), Uruguayan footballer
- Maximiliano Arboleya (1870–1951), Spanish sociologist, priest and activist
- Maximiliano Arias (born 1988), Uruguayan footballer
- Maximiliano Asís (born 1987), Argentine footballer
- Maximiliano Badell (born 1988), Argentine footballer
- Maximiliano Bajter (born 1986), Uruguayan footballer
- Maximiliano Blanco (born 1977), Argentine footballer
- Maximiliano Bustos (born 1982), Argentine footballer
- Maximiliano Bustos (rugby union) (born 1986), Argentine rugby union player
- Maximiliano Caire (born 1988), Argentine footballer
- Maximiliano Caldas (born 1973), Argentine field hockey player
- Maximiliano Calzada (born 1990), Uruguayan footballer
- Maximiliano Cejas (born 1980), Argentine footballer
- Maximiliano Ceratto (born 1988), Argentine footballer
- Maximiliano Coronel (born 1989), Argentine footballer
- Maximiliano Cuberas (born 1973), Argentine footballer
- Maximiliano Djerfy (1974–2021), Argentine musician and singer-songwriter
- Maximiliano Estévez (born 1977), Argentine footballer
- Maximiliano Faotto (1910–?), Uruguayan footballer and manager
- Maximiliano Flotta (born 1978), Argentine footballer
- Maximiliano Gagliardo (born 1983), Argentine footballer
- Maximiliano Giusti (born 1991), Argentine footballer
- Maximiliano Gómez (1943–1971), Dominican Republic Maoist politician
- Maximiliano Hernández Martínez (1882–1966), President of El Salvador
- Maximiliano Jones (1871–1944), Equatoguinean farmer
- Maximiliano Kosteki (1980–2002), Argentine activist
- Maximiliano Larroquette, American automobile designer
- Maximiliano Laso (born 1988), Argentine footballer
- Maximiliano Andrés Laso (born 1988), Argentine footballer
- Maximiliano Lélis Rodrigues (born 1987), Brazilian footballer
- Maximiliano Leonel Rodríguez (born 1994), Argentine footballer
- Maximiliano Lombardi (born 1987), Uruguayan footballer
- Maximiliano Mirabet (born 1982), Argentine footballer
- Maximiliano Montero (born 1988), Uruguayan footballer
- Maximiliano Moralez (born 1985), Argentine footballer
- Maximiliano Núñez (born 1986), Argentine footballer
- Maximiliano Oliva (born 1990), Argentine footballer
- Maximiliano Pellegrino (born 1980), Argentine footballer
- Maximiliano Pereira (born 1984), Uruguayan footballer
- Maximiliano Pérez (born 1986), Argentine footballer
- Maximiliano Poblete (1873–1946), Chilean politician
- Maximiliano Ré (born 1987), Argentine footballer
- Maximiliano Richeze (born 1983), Argentine cyclist
- Maximiliano Scapparoni (born 1989), Argentine footballer
- Maximiliano Silerio Esparza (born 1939), Mexican politician
- Maximiliano Stanic (born 1978), Argentine basketball player
- Maximiliano Timpanaro (born 1988), Argentine footballer
- Maximiliano Uggè (born 1991), Italian footballer
- Maximiliano Urruti (born 1991), Argentine footballer
- Maximiliano Vallejo (born 1982), Argentine footballer
- Maximiliano Velázquez (born 1980), Argentine footballer

== See also ==
- Maximilian
