= Massimiliano =

- Pronunciation: Italian: [massimiˈljaːno]
- Gender: Male

Origin
- Origin: Italian
- Region of origin: Italy

Other names
- Related names: Maximilian, Maximiliano, Maximus, Max

Massimiliano is a masculine Italian given name. Notable people with the name include:

- Massimiliano Alajmo (born 1974), Italian chef
- Massimiliano Allegri (born 1967), Italian footballer and manager
- Massimiliano Ammendola (born 1990), Italian footballer
- Massimiliano Barbone (born 1991), Italian footballer
- Massimiliano Benassi (born 1981), Italian footballer
- Massimiliano Busellato (born 1993), Italian footballer
- Massimiliano Soldani Benzi (1656–1740), Italian sculptor and medallist
- Massimiliano Blardone (born 1979), Italian alpine skier
- Massimiliano Brizzi (born 1975), Italian footballer
- Massimiliano Cappellini (born 1971), Italian footballer
- Massimiliano Cappioli (born 1968), Italian footballer
- Massimiliano Caputo (born 1980), Italian footballer
- Massimiliano Capuzzoni (1969–1995), Italian rugby union player
- Massimiliano Carletti (born 1973), Italian footballer
- Massimiliano Cavalera (born 1969), lead vocalist for Soulfly
- Massimiliano Chiamenti (1967–2011), Italian poet and philologist
- Massimiliano Donati (born 1979), Italian sprinter
- Massimiliano Duran (born 1963), Italian boxer
- Massimiliano Eroli (born 1976), Italian swimmer
- Massimiliano Esposito (born 1972), Italian footballer
- Massimiliano Ferretti (born 1966), Italian water polo player
- Massimiliano Frani (born 1967), Italian musician
- Massimiliano Frezzato (born 1967), Italian comic book writer
- Massimiliano Fuksas (born 1944), Italian architect
- Massimiliano Fusani (born 1979), Italian footballer
- Massimiliano Giacobbo (born 1974), Italian footballer
- Massimiliano Gioni (born 1973), Italian art curator and critic
- Massimiliano Lelli (born 1967), Italian cyclist
- Massimiliano Marsili (born 1987), Italian footballer
- Massimiliano Masin (born 1968), Italian baseball player
- Massimiliano Massimo (died 1911), Italian Jesuit
- Massimiliano Manfredi (born 1969), Italian voice actor
- Massimiliano Messieri (born 1964), Italian composer
- Massimiliano Mori (born 1974), Italian cyclist
- Massimiliano Narducci (born 1964), Italian tennis player
- Massimiliano Neri (born 1977), Italian model
- Massimiliano Ossari (1977–2002), Italian footballer
- Massimiliano Palombara (1614–1680), marquis of Pietraforte and Conservator of Rome
- Massimiliano Pedalà (born 1969), Italian racing driver
- Massimiliano Pesenti (born 1987), Italian footballer
- Massimiliano Romeo (born 1971), Italian politician
- Massimiliano Rosa (born 1970), Italian footballer
- Massimiliano Rosolino (born 1978), Italian swimmer
- Massimiliano Scaglia (born 1977), Italian footballer
- Massimiliano Taddei (born 1991), Italian footballer
- Massimiliano Tacchinardi (born 1971), Italian footballer
- Massimiliano Tagliani (born 1989), Italian footballer
- Massimiliano Varricchio (born 1976), Italian footballer
- Massimiliano Versace (born 1972), Italian scientist
- Massimiliano Zazzetta (born 1979), Italian footballer

== See also ==
- Maximilian
