= CTJ =

CTJ may refer to:

- Calvin Theological Journal, an academic journal published by Calvin Theological Seminary
- Citizens for Tax Justice, a Washington, D.C.–based think tank and advocacy group
- CTJ, the FAA LID code for West Georgia Regional Airport, Carrollton, Georgia
- CTJ, the IATA code for Caserta railway station, Campania, Italy
