= KCTJ =

KCTJ may refer to:

- KCTJ, a post nominal identifying a Knight Commandeur (Knight Commander) of the Knights Templar; Ordo Supremus Militaris Templi Hierosolymitani. This rank of Knighthood is equivalent to a Major/Lieutenant Colonel grade. A Knight Commandeur wears a red, patriarchal cross in gold, suspended below a crown, suspended below a trophy shield on a red and black neck ribbon. The Knights Templar of OSMTH are recognized in Special Consultative Status by the United Nations
- KCTJ-LP, a defunct low-power radio station (107.1 FM) formerly licensed to serve Finley Point, Montana, United States
- West Georgia Regional Airport (ICAO code KCTJ)
