= Larroquette =

Larroquette is a surname. Notable people with the surname include:

- John Larroquette (born 1947), American actor
- Mariana Larroquette (born 1992), Argentine professional footballer
- Maximiliano Larroquette, Argentine mechanical engineer

== See also ==
- The John Larroquette Show, American sitcom television series
