= Latshaw =

Latshaw is a surname. Notable people with the surname include:

- Bob Latshaw (1917–2001), American baseball player and manager
- Ralph S. Latshaw (1865–1932), American judge
- Robert T. Latshaw (1925–1956), American Korean War flying ace
- Steve Latshaw (born 1959), American screenwriter, producer, and director
