= Emperor Maximilian =

Emperor Maximilian may refer to:

- Maximilian I, Holy Roman Emperor (1459–1519)
- Maximilian II, Holy Roman Emperor (1564–1576)
- Maximilian I of Mexico, Austrian-born Emperor of Mexico (1861–1867)

== See also ==
- Maximilian (disambiguation)
