= Curtze =

Curtze is a German surname. Notable people with the surname include:

- Charles A. Curtze (1911–2007), American admiral
- Maximilian Curtze (1837–1903), German mathematician and historian of mathematics
