= Massimiliano Massimo Institute =

Jesuit secondary school in Rome, Italy

Coordinates: 41°49′47.03″N 12°27′26.38″E

- Rome; Italy

Information
- Type: Secondary
- Denomination: Catholic
- Founded: 1551; 475 years ago
- Oversight: Jesuit
- Gender: Coeducational
- Website: www.istitutomassimo.it

The Massimiliano Massimo Institute (Istituto Massimiliano Massimo) is a Jesuit school in Rome. It is considered one of the most prestigious and exclusive schools in Rome. The school, with over 10,000 former students, has one of the most prestigious alumni registries in Italy.

== History ==
Its roots are in the School of Grammar, Humanities and Christian Doctrine, a small school set up in Via Nuova Capitolina (now Via dell'Aracœli) by Ignatius Loyola in 1551. That school proved a success and so pope Gregory XIII ordered the construction of a larger institution, which opened on 28 October 1584 as the Roman College. In this and other Jesuit colleges was written the 1559 Ratio Studiorum, a document which is still the basis of the teaching methods in Jesuit schools. Those methods were followed in the Roman College until the Jesuits' suppression in 1773 and were restored with the order in 1814 by Pope Pius VII.

In 1870 the Italian government confiscated the building for the Ennio Quirino Visconti Liceo Ginnasio, with the College's professors and students moving to the nearby palazzo Borromeo until the Pontifical Gregorian University was built to take its university students. However, in 1873, Father Massimiliano Massimo (after whom the institute is named) inherited the Palazzo Peretti and, in 1879, made it available to the Jesuits for the re-foundation of a school to continue the Roman College's work in secondary education. In 1960, due to a rise in student numbers, the Institute was transferred from Terme (near the Stazione Termini) to EUR, where it now stands. It stands out from the skyline at EUR thanks to the odd shape of its church and its position on the highest point of the EUR pentagon. In 1973 it was allowed to enrol its first set of female students and in 1987 all its classes were made co-ed.

The institute participates in many sports, both in the schools league and the sports associations, such as hockey, long jump, athletics, weightlifting, racing, and basketball. It is also the headquarters of the Student Missionary League, a Jesuit movement for the spiritual training of secondary students, organising meetings and work camps in preparation for confirmation of those in and above their third year at secondary school.

== Notable alumni ==
- Luigi Abete
- Luca Cordero di Montezemolo
- Mario Draghi
- Ettore Majorana
- Giancarlo Abete
- Giancarlo Magalli
- Gianni De Gennaro
- Giorgio Barberio Corsetti
- Pier Luigi Nervi
- Carolina Crescentini
- Giancarlo Buono

Each year the school's Alumni Association awards a prize to an alumnus who has shown particular distinction in their professional, cultural, or social life and maintained their relationship with the Institute and the Society of Jesus, or to a staff member of the Society or Institute distinguished for their activity in teaching.

== See also ==
- List of Jesuit sites
