= Petrus de Dacia =

Petrus de Dacia may refer to:

- Petrus de Dacia (mathematician) (c. 1250–c. 1310)
- Petrus de Dacia (Dominican friar) (1235–1289)
