= Ralph S. Latshaw =

American judge (1865–1932)

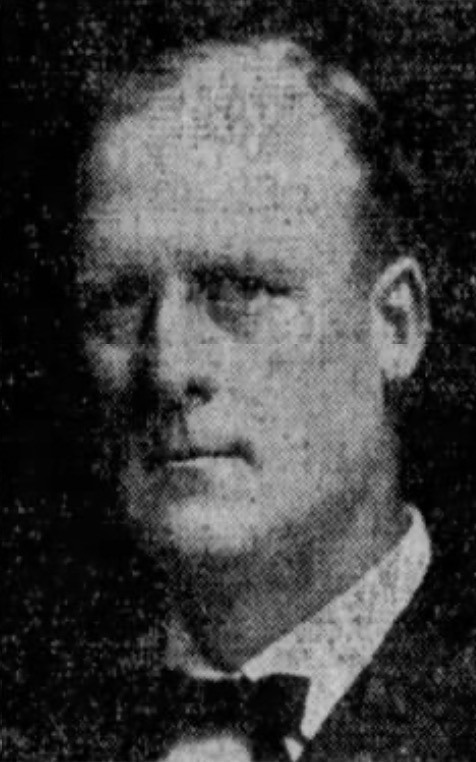
- Latshaw in 1910

Judge of the Jackson County Criminal Court
- In office 1908–1923

Judge of the 16th Missouri Judicial Court
- In office 1926 – May 12, 1932

Personal details
- Born: October 7, 1865 Paris, Ontario, Canada
- Died: May 12, 1932 (aged 66) Kansas City, Missouri, US
- Party: Democratic
- Children: 6
- Education: Georgetown University
- Occupation: Judge

Ralph S. Latshaw (October 7, 1865 – May 12, 1932) was an American judge who served in the courts of Jackson County, Missouri.

== Biography ==
Latshaw was born on October 7, 1865, in Paris, Ontario. Of English ancestry, he one of four sons born to Henry J. Latshaw. At three months old, he immigrated to Kansas City, Missouri. He attended public schools and studied at Georgetown University, later reading law under Judge John W. Wofford.

Latshaw was a member of the Democratic Party, associating with Tom Pendergast throughout his career. His first public office was as postmaster of Centropolis, Kansas; he was appointed by Grover Cleveland and resigned in 1893. He then served as assistant prosecuting attorney and worked in private law practice. He was first elected Judge of the Jackson County Criminal Court in 1908 to fill a vacancy after a death in office. The court was disestablished in 1923. From 1926 to until his death, he served in the 16th Missouri Judicial Court; his death left an unexpired term which ended on January 1, 1933. Cases he presided over included the 1910 Thomas H. Swope murder trial, the Mattie Howard murder trial, and the 1931 Bridge Murder case.

Latshaw was described by The Kansas City Star as "fearless and outspoken in his opinions". In 1913, he ruled against William Rockhill Nelson for contempt of court, despite him being a fellow Democrat. He was also described as a harsh sentencer, though also granted parole to over 1,800 prisoners during his tenure. He was particularly harsh in sentencing defendants of domestic violence cases.

On March 20, 1889, Latshaw married Nellie Lewers, the daughter of a farmer from Hawaii; they had six children together. In July 1931, he visited the Mayo Clinic, at which point he was declared ill. For the remainder of his life, he served as judge infrequently and was succeeded by acting jurists. He died on May 12, 1932, aged 66, in Kansas City, from cancer. He was buried at his family in Mount Washington Cemetery, in Independence.
