= Maximillion =

Maximillion may refer to:

== People ==
- Maximillion Cooper, founder of the Gumball 3000 business
- Max Thieriot (Maximillion Drake Thieriot, born 1988), American actor and director

== Fictional characters ==
- Maximillion Pegasus, in the Yu-Gi-Oh! anime and manga series
- Maximillion Galactica, in video game Phoenix Wright: Ace Attorney − Justice for All

== See also ==
- Maximilian, a name
- Max-A-Million, music group
