= Gary Pomerantz =

American journalist

Gary M. Pomerantz
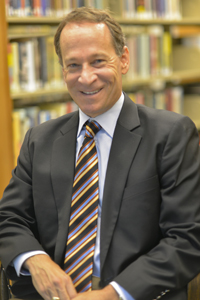
- Pomerantz in 2014
- Born: Gary Mason Pomerantz; November 17, 1960 (age 65); North Tarrytown, New York, U.S.
- Occupations: Author, lecturer, journalist
- Writing career
- Genre: Non-fiction
- Subjects: History, race relations, sports
- Website: garympomerantz.com

Gary M. Pomerantz (born November 17, 1960) is an American journalist and author who lectures in the graduate program in journalism at Stanford University. His books include Where Peachtree Meets Sweet Auburn (1996 New York Times Notable Book of the Year), a multi-generational biography of Atlanta, Georgia and its racial conscience, told through the families of Atlanta Mayors Maynard Jackson and Ivan Allen Jr., and The Last Pass: Cousy, Russell, the Celtics, and What Matters in the End (2018), a New York Times bestseller about race, regret and the storied Boston Celtics dynasty.

== Early life ==
Pomerantz was born in North Tarrytown, New York, the youngest of three boys. His family moved to Orlando, Florida, when he was a boy, and then to Los Angeles in 1971. He studied history at the University of California, Berkeley, graduating with BA in 1982. While at Berkeley, he served for a time as sports editor of the flagship student newspaper, The Daily Californian.

== Career ==
Pomerantz worked as a daily journalist for nearly two decades. In 1981, he followed John Feinstein and Michael Wilbon as a summer intern in the sports department at The Washington Post. At the Post, he covered Georgetown University basketball and the National Football League. In 1987–1988, he served as a Journalism Fellow at the University of Michigan, studying theater and the Bible. He then moved to The Atlanta Journal-Constitution where, for the next 11 years, he wrote social and political profiles, special projects, columns and served on the newspaper's editorial board.

His six nonfiction books feature a broad array of topics. Nine Minutes Twenty Seconds (2001), about the crash of Atlantic Southeast Airlines Flight 529, was also published in China, Germany and Britain. In WILT, 1962 (2005), Pomerantz describes the night when basketball star Wilt Chamberlain scored 100 points in a game against the New York Knicks in Hershey, Pennsylvania. Named an "Editors' Choice" book by The New York Times, WILT, 1962 was described by Entertainment Weekly as "a meticulous and engaging narrative – a slam dunk of a read."

Where Peachtree Meets Sweet Auburn was optioned by independent studio wiip in fall 2021 and is currently in development for adaptation to television.

In 2017, Canadian author Malcolm Gladwell praised Where Peachtree Meets Sweet Auburn, telling Business Insider, "It's probably the best book I've read in quite some time. It's an incredibly cool way to think about a city. I've always been fascinated by Atlanta, and I didn't really understand the city until I read that book . . . It's told so beautifully through these two families. It's really a remarkable book." His book, Their Life's Work, about the Pittsburgh Steelers' football dynasty of the 1970s, short-listed for the 2014 PEN/ESPN Award for literary sportswriting.

From 1999 to 2001 Pomerantz served as distinguished visiting professor of journalism at Emory University in Atlanta. In 2007, he began lecturing at Stanford University, teaching courses on specialized reporting and writing.

== Personal life ==
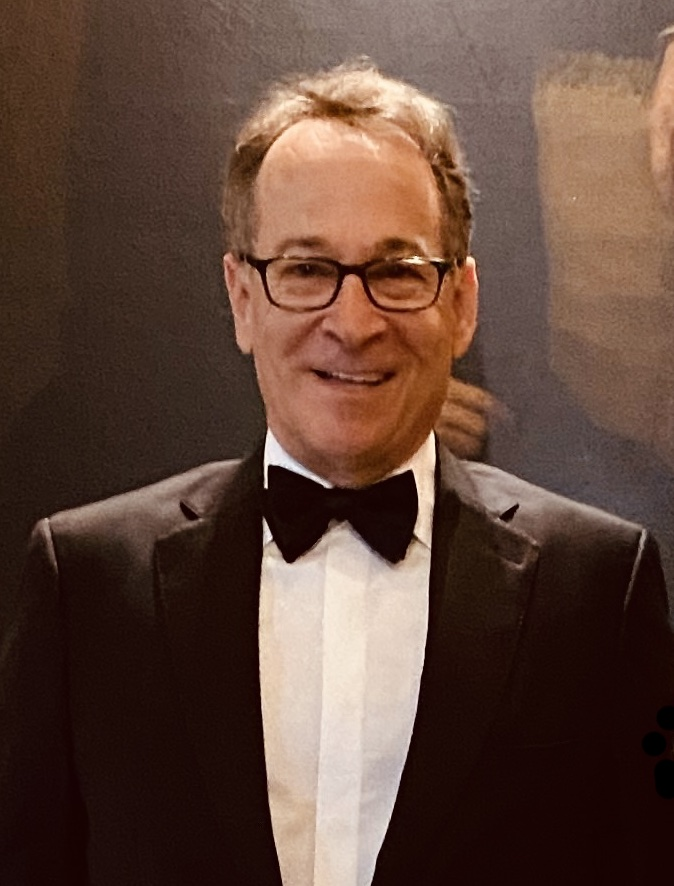
Pomerantz in 2022

Pomerantz lives in the San Francisco Bay Area with his wife Carrie Schwab-Pomerantz, daughter of Charles R. Schwab.

== Books ==
- Pomerantz, Gary M. (1996). Where Peachtree Meets Sweet Auburn: A Saga of Race and Family (1st ed.). Scribner's. ISBN 0684807173.
- Pomerantz, Gary M. (2001). Nine Minutes, Twenty Seconds: The Tragedy & Triumph of ASA Flight 529 (1st ed.). Crown Publishers. ISBN 0609606336.
- Pomerantz, Gary M. (2005). WILT, 1962: The Night of 100 Points and the Dawn of a New Era (1st ed.). Crown Publishers. ISBN 1400051606.
- Pomerantz, Gary M. (2009). The Devil's Tickets: A Night of Bridge, a Fatal Hand, and a New American Age (1st ed.). Crown Publishers. ISBN 978-1400051625.
- Pomerantz, Gary M. (2013). Their Life's Work: The Brotherhood of the 1970s Pittsburgh Steelers, Then and Now (1st ed.). Simon & Schuster. ISBN 978-1451691627.
- Pomerantz, Gary M. (2018). The Last Pass: Cousy, Russell, the Celtics, and What Matters in the End (1st ed.) Penguin Press. ISBN 0735223610

== See also ==
- Bridge Murder case
