= Bridge Murder case =

1929 murder in the United States

- Date: February 23 – March 6, 1931
- Venue: Criminal Court Building
- Location: Kansas City, Missouri
- Also known as: Bridge Table Murder case
- Type: Murder trial
- Motive: Revenge after physical abuse
- Target: John G. Bennett
- Suspects: Myrtle Adkins Bennett
- Charges: Murder
- Verdict: Not guilty

The Bridge Murder case, also known as the Bridge Table Murder case, was the trial of Myrtle Adkins Bennett (born March 20, 1895, in Tillar, Arkansas), a Kansas City housewife, for the murder of her husband John G. Bennett over a game of contract bridge in September 1929. The case attracted attention before Bennett was acquitted.

== Murder ==
Myrtle and John spent much of Sunday, September 29, 1929, with their upstairs neighbors, Charles and Myrna Hofman. The husbands played a round of golf at the Indian Hills Country Club that morning, and then went back to the links that afternoon with their wives joining them. At dusk, they returned to the Bennett apartment at 902 Ward Parkway in the Country Club District of Kansas City. After sharing dinner, they sat down to a game of bridge in the Bennett living room, the couples playing as partners, the Hofmans versus the Bennetts. After midnight, as the Hofmans began to pull ahead, the Bennetts began to bicker. In the final hand, John failed to make his four spades contract and Myrtle, frustrated by the failure, called him "a bum bridge player". He stood and slapped her in the face several times, and announced he was leaving. He said he would spend the night in a motel in Saint Joseph, Missouri. As he packed his bag, and moved from room to room, he mocked his wife. Myrtle told the Hofmans, "Only a cur would strike a woman in front of guests."

After an ongoing argument, John Bennett went to pack a suitcase as he told Myrtle to retrieve the handgun he typically carried on the road for protection. Myrtle walked down the hall to the bedroom of her mother, Alice Adkins. Still sobbing, Myrtle reached into a drawer with linens and pulled out his .32 Colt semi automatic, and walked into the den. There, she brushed past Charles Hofman, and shot at John's back twice in the bathroom of the apartment. John escaped into the hallway, but fell to the floor in their living room.

== Trial ==
Myrtle Bennett was tried before Judge Ralph S. Latshaw. The trial began on February 23, 1931, and lasted eleven days. Her defense lawyer was James A. Reed, former three-term U.S. Senator and onetime Democratic presidential candidate. Reed showed jurors that John Bennett had been previously violent and abusive, and attempted to explain that Mrs Bennett was either insane or acted in self-defense. The judge barred the prosecuting lawyer, James R. Page, from presenting the testimony of John Bennett's nephew Byrd Rice, as he was not on the original list of witnesses. After an eight-hour deliberation, the jury returned a not guilty verdict, concluding that the killing was an accident. The prosecutor's assistant, John Hill, said, "It looks like an open season on husbands."

== Press ==
The case caught the public imagination, and was subject to press attention by the New York Journal, not for the trial itself, but for the bridge game. The case was a media sensation and a flashpoint in the bridge craze sweeping the nation. The Journal invited speculation from bridge experts, including Sidney Lenz, on the game, what hands had been played, and whether different play, or alternative hands, would have prevented the murder. None of the people present in the apartment at the time later recalled exactly what the hands were.

Ely Culbertson wrote about the killing and trial in his new magazine, The Bridge World. In lectures, Culbertson suggested that if only the Bennetts had been playing the Culbertson System of bidding, then 36-year-old John Bennett might still have been alive.

== Life after the trial ==
Only 35 years old at the time of her acquittal, Myrtle Bennett lived for another 61 years, dying at the age of 96 in Miami, Florida, in January 1992. She had moved into obscurity soon after the trial, her name fading from headlines. She never remarried, nor did she have children. After World War II and throughout the 1950s, she worked as executive head of housekeeping at the elegant Carlyle Hotel in New York City, living alone there in an apartment. At the Carlyle, she developed friendships with the rich and famous, including the actors Mary Pickford and her husband Buddy Rogers, and also Henry Ford II.

The widow Bennett later traveled the world, working for a hotel chain, and played bridge until nearly the end of her life. In an interview with the author Gary Pomerantz, Myrtle Bennett's cousin, Carolyn Scruggs of Arkansas, said that Mrs. Bennett never spoke with her about the shooting. Once, though, Ms. Scruggs told Mrs. Bennett, "I sometimes think of your life –" But Myrtle Bennett interrupted, and said, "Well, my dear, it was a great tragedy and a great mistake." Scruggs stammered to say, "I guess I want you to know that I understand it." But Myrtle Bennett said, "No, my dear, you don't understand it."

At the time of her 1992 death, Myrtle Bennett's estate was valued at more than $1 million. With no direct descendants, she left most of the money to family members of John Bennett, the husband she had killed more than six decades before.
