= Petrus de Dacia (mathematician) =

Danish mathematician and astronomer

Petrus de Dacia, also called Philomena and Peder Nattergal (Peter Nightingale), was a Danish scholar who lived in the 13th century. He worked mainly in Paris and Italy, writing in Latin. He published a calendar of new moon dates for the years 1292-1367. In 1292, he published a book on mathematics that contained a new method for the calculation of cubic roots. He also described a mechanical instrument to predict solar and lunar eclipses as seen from Paris.

== Editions ==
- Corpus Philosophorum Danicorum Medii Aevi vol. X, ed. Fritz Saaby Pedersen. Copenhagen 1983.
- Petri Philomeni de Dacia in Algorismum vulgarem Johannis de Sacrobosco commentarius, edited by Maximilian Curtze, year 1897. This text by Petrus Philomena de Dacia is a commentary about elementary methods in arithmetic. Its primary notability is that it has a better method for extracting cube roots (better than the pre-existing method reported by Johannes de Sacrobosco).
