= Student Missionary League =

Catholic youth training organization

The Student Missionary League (Italian: Lega missionaria studenti, LMS) is a Roman Catholic youth-training organisation set up by the Jesuits of the Istituto Massimiliano Massimo in 1927.

The LMS is a member of MAGIS, the official Jesuit NGO, and since 2010 it is the missionary section of the Italian CLC involved in the training for volunteers.

The LMS methodology is based on "action - prayer - study", a synthesis of its missionary vocation, Catholic nature, and the propensity to analyse the global and local social context.

The LMS has been mainly involved with missionary and volunteering work-camps in Romania, Bosnia, Peru, Cuba and Kenya, where it has developed long-term projects such as family-houses, family and children centres, and schools. In Italy, it has been involved with local emergencies such as the 2009 L'Aquila earthquake and the asylum-seekers in Ragusa.

IYCS (International Young Catholic Student) is a global movement of young Catholic (term) students committed to building a peaceful, just and sustainable world.

== See also ==
- Christian Life Community
- Jesuits
