= Maximilian Forte =

Canadian anthropologist

Maximilian Forte is a professor of anthropology at the Concordia University Department of Sociology and Anthropology in Montreal, Quebec, Canada.

== Biography ==
Maximilian Forte received an Honours B.A., with a double major in Latin American and Caribbean Studies and Spanish Language, Literature, and Linguistics (including Latin America) at York University in 1990, graduating summa cum laude. He then moved to Trinidad and Tobago, where he enrolled in the post-graduate diploma program at the Institute of International Relations at the University of the West Indies, Saint Augustine. After completing the one-year program, he continued into the start of the M.Phil. program, which he discontinued after two years.

He was in Trinidad from 1990 until 1993.

In 1994 he began a M.A. in socio-cultural anthropology at the State University of New York at Binghamton, where he also continued and developed interests in world-systems analysis, taking courses in other departments with Immanuel Wallerstein, Giovanni Arrighi, and Anthony King. He also completed the first year of the Ph.D. program there, but then moved to Australia, where from 1997 through 2001 he completed his Ph.D. in anthropology at the University of Adelaide. He then moved back again to Trinidad and Tobago, where he remained until 2003, and eventually achieved permanent resident status, the first step on the way to gaining Trinidadian nationality.

In 2003 he took up his first tenure-track position in anthropology, in the Department of Anthropology and Sociology, at what was then called the University College of Cape Breton. In 2005 he accepted an offer for a second tenure-track position, in the Department of Sociology and Anthropology at Concordia University in Montreal, where he received tenure and have been promoted to associate professor.

Maximilian Forte also lived in Italy, and spent extended periods in England, as well as French Polynesia. His first language was Italian, which he continues to speak, in addition to later learning Spanish and French.

=== Works ===
Maximilian is the author of Ruins of Absence, Presence of Caribs: (Post)Colonial Representations of Aboriginality in Trinidad and Tobago (2005), and Slouching Towards Sirte: NATO’s War on Libya and Africa (2012). He is also the editor and a contributing author of Indigenous Resurgence in the Contemporary Caribbean: Amerindian Survival And Revival (2006), Indigenous Cosmopolitans: Transnational and Transcultural Indigeneity in the Twenty-First Century (2010), and Who Is An Indian? Race, Place, and the Politics of Indigeneity in the Americas (2013). He also publishes The New Imperialism series, which features research by students in his advanced seminar in the field, and his own research.

He started "Zero Anthropology" (first called "Open Anthropology") back in October 2007. The lead site was the journal. The focus of his writing has been on militarism, the militarization of the social sciences, U.S. foreign policy, imperialism, decolonization, the Human Terrain System, the Minerva Research Initiative, and various forms of "humanitarian imperialism". He focus on anthropology against/after empire, and occasionally items about the Caribbean. His articles on the Zero Anthropology, numbering more than 1,000, have covered topics pertaining to Canada, the U.S., Trinidad & Tobago, Mexico, Zimbabwe, Iran, Iraq, Greece, Gaza, Libya, and Afghanistan.

Forte teaches courses in the area of Political Anthropology, with related courses and seminars on the New Imperialism, Indigenous Resurgence, and Globalization, and additional courses on the Caribbean, Decolonizing Anthropology, New Directions in Anthropology, media ethnographies, visual anthropology, and in the past, cyberspace ethnography. He has won a number of grants and awards, including two awards for excellence in teaching.
