= Giancarlo Buono =

Italian pilot, businessman and university lecturer

Giancarlo Buono (born October 10, 1969) is an Italian pilot, executive and university lecturer. Since January 2025, he is the Safety and Airspace Group Director at the UK CAA, responsible for the organisation’s safety and airspace regulatory functions, and an Executive Director of the UK CAA Board. Previously he has been the Regional Director Safety and Flight Operation for the European region at IATA. As a former air force pilot, he has been the youngest Combat Ready Panavia Tornado pilot in the Italian Air Force, and an airline pilot and commander, as well as holding various management posts, at various Airlines, including Lauda Air, Alitalia and Lufthansa Italia.

For his participation as a fighter pilot in the NATO Operation Sharp Guard peace keeping operation in Former Yugoslavia, he has been awarded with the NATO Medal.

He is an expert in Air Transport Safety and has been a strong advocate of the implementation of a performance based safety oversight system in the EU. During his time at IATA, He has been a long standing Chair of the EASA Stakeholders Advisory Body, representing the Aviation Industry as an Observer in the EASA Management Board and represented Civil Air Space Users in the SESAR Joint Undertaking Administrative Board. He was also the Vice-Chair of the NM Board as well as an Observer to the EUROCONTROL Provisional Council and a member of the ICAO Europe Air Navigation Planning Group.

He is a visiting lecturer at City St. George's University of London and at University of Messina. He has also been a visiting lecturer at the University of Geneva.

Capt. Buono is a Fellow of the Royal Aeronautical Society.
