= Maximilian Gludau =

German politician (born 1998)

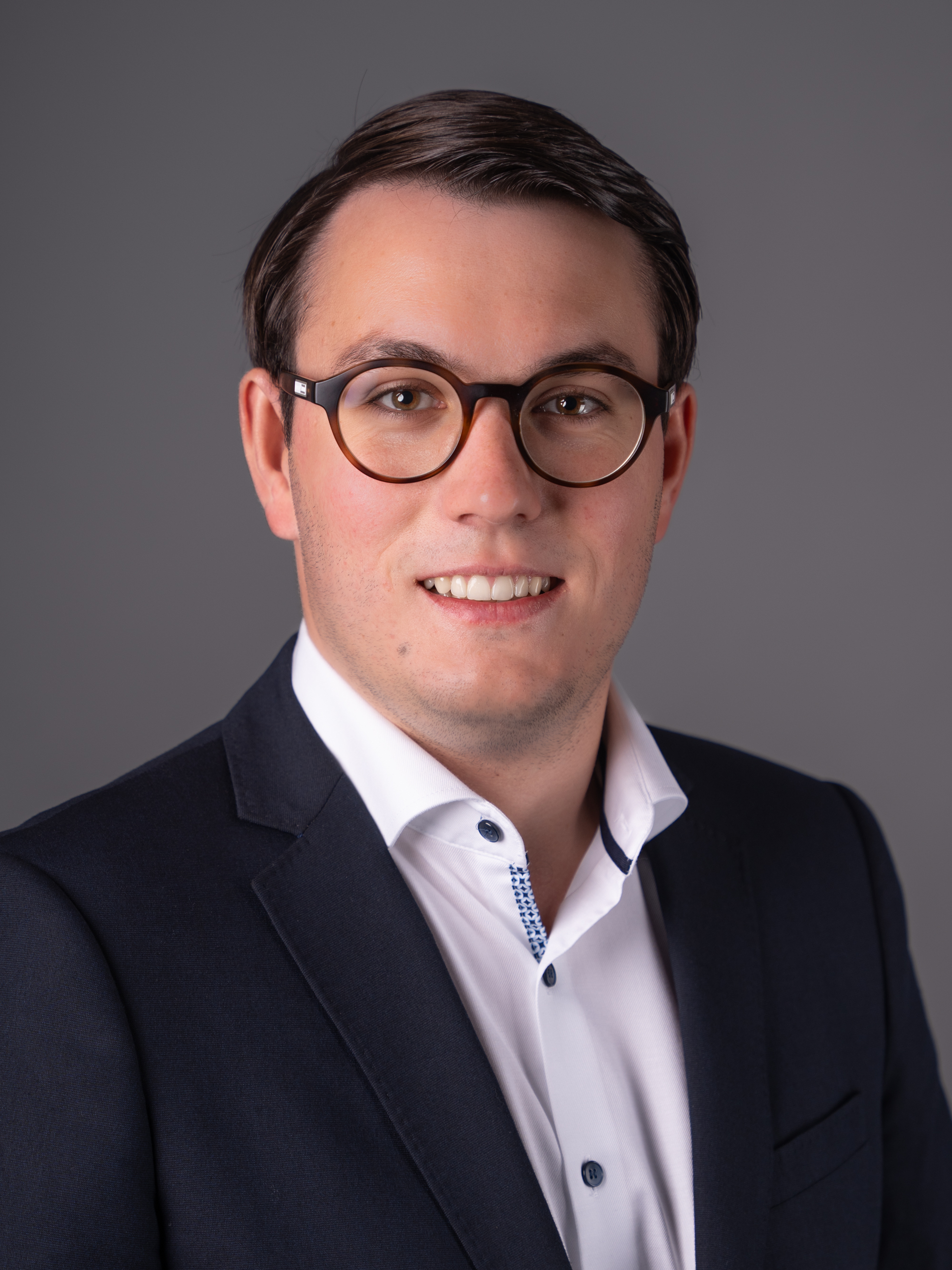
- Gludau in 2023

Member of the Landtag of Saxony-Anhalt
- Incumbent
- Assumed office 1 August 2023
- Preceded by: Johann Hauser

Personal details
- Born: 6 October 1998 (age 27)
- Party: Free Democratic Party (since 2014)

Maximilian Gludau (born 6 October 1998) is a German politician serving as a member of the Landtag of Saxony-Anhalt since 2023. He has served as chairman of the Free Democratic Party in the Burgenlandkreis since 2021.
