= Maximilian Menton =

German politician (born 1995)

Member of the Landtag of Baden-Württemberg
- Incumbent
- Assumed office 11 May 2026
- Constituency: Reutlingen

Personal details
- Born: 21 June 1995 (age 30)
- Party: Christian Democratic Union (since 2009)

Maximilian Menton (born 21 June 1995) is a German politician who was elected member of the Landtag of Baden-Württemberg in 2026. He is a gynecologist at the Tübingen University Hospital.
