= Serbian civil war of 1331 =

1331 conflict in Serbia

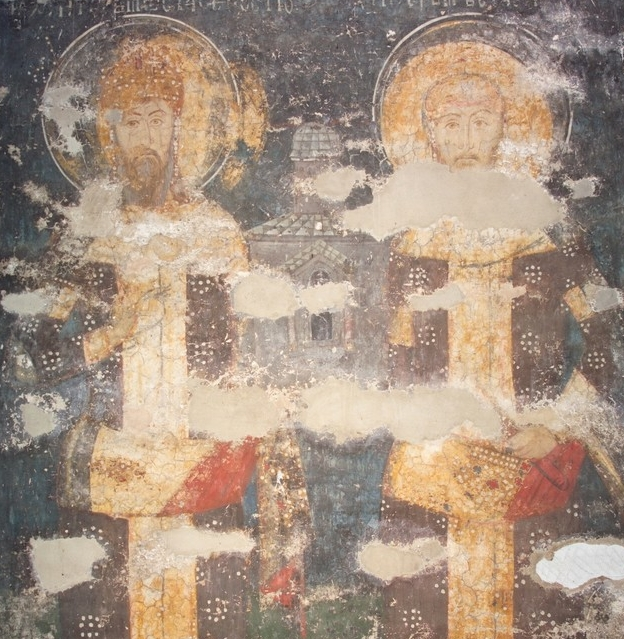
- Fresco of father and son, Visoki Dečani (UNESCO), 14th century.
Date	February – 21 August 1331
Location	Kingdom of Serbia
Result	Stefan Uroš III surrenders, Stefan Dušan crowned King

Belligerents
King Stefan Uroš III	Young King Stefan Dušan

The Serbian civil war of 1331 broke out following King Stefan Uroš III's decision not to continue campaigning against the Byzantine Empire when he had the chance following the victory at the Battle of Velbazhd against Bulgaria, alienating much of the nobility, which became divided supporting either Uroš III or his son, Stefan Dušan.

== Background ==
In 1330, an alliance was formed by Bulgaria and the Byzantine Empire, which sought to invade Serbia. In 1330, Young King Dušan defeated Bulgarian Emperor Michael III Shishman at Velbazhd, after which King Uroš III appointed his nephew Ivan Stefan at the Bulgarian throne in August.

== History ==
Uroš III's decision not to attack the Byzantines after the victory at the Battle of Velbazhd against Bulgaria resulted in the alienation of many nobles, who sought to expand to the south. By January or February 1331, Dušan was quarreling with his father, perhaps pressured by the nobility. According to contemporary pro-Dušan sources, evil advisors turned Uroš III against his son; he decided to seize and exclude Dušan from his inheritance. Uroš III sent an army into Zeta against his son, the army ravaged Skadar, but Dušan had crossed the Bojana. A brief period of anarchy in parts of Serbia took place before the father and son concluded peace in April 1331. Three months later, Uroš III ordered Dušan to meet him. Dušan feared for his life and his advisors persuaded him to resist, so Dušan marched from Skadar to Nerodimlje, where he besieged his father. Uroš III fled, and Dušan captured the treasury and family. He then pursued his father, catching up with him at Petrić. On 21 August 1331, Uroš III surrendered, and on the advice or insistence of Dušan's advisors, he was imprisoned. Dušan was crowned King of All Serbian and Maritime lands in the first week of September.

The civil war had prevented Serbia from aiding Ivan Stephen and Anna Neda in Bulgaria, who was deposed in March 1331, taking refuge in the mountains. Ivan Alexander of Bulgaria feared for the danger of Serbia as the situation there had settled, and immediately sought peace with Dušan. As Dušan wanted to move against richer Byzantium, the two made peace and an alliance in December 1331, accepting Ivan Alexander as ruler. It was sealed with the marriage of Dušan and Helena, the sister of Ivan Alexander.

== Aftermath ==
Dušan later conquered most of the Byzantine Empire, and was crowned Emperor in 1346.

== Sources ==
- Fajfrić, Željko (2000) [1998], Sveta loza Stefana Nemanje (Internet ed.), Belgrade: Janus; Rastko
- Fine, John Van Antwerp (1994), The Late Medieval Balkans: A Critical Survey from the Late Twelfth Century to the Ottoman Conquest, University of Michigan Press, ISBN 978-0-472-08260-5
