= Bernard of Alzira =

12th-century Catholic convert and martyr

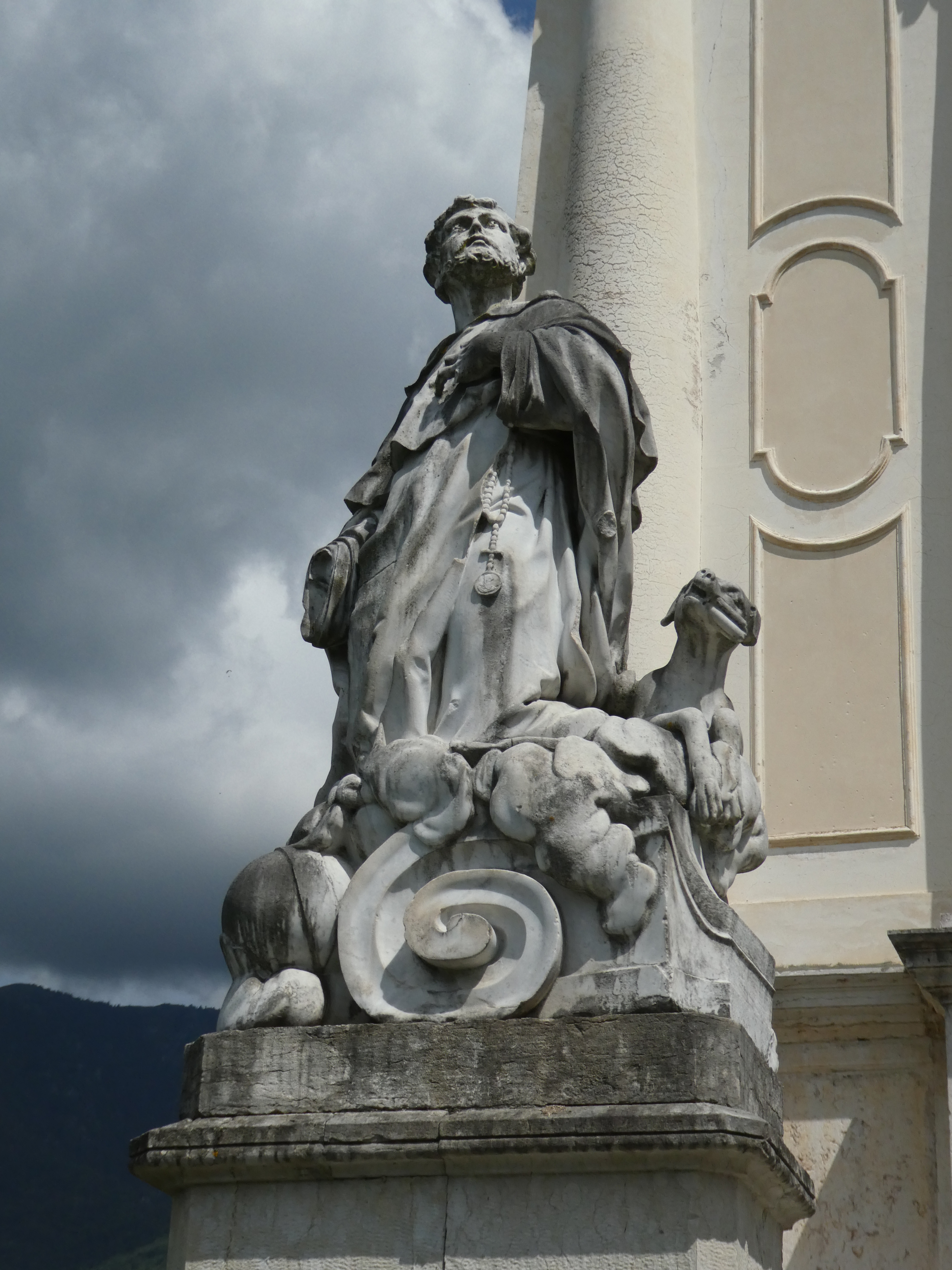
Statue of saint Bernard of Alzira by the parish church of Sant'Eulalia (Borso del Grappa, Italy)

Bernard of Alzira (born Ahmet Ibn Al-Mansur in 1135, Carlet, Valencia, Spain - Alzira, Valencia, Spain, 1181) was an Andalusian prince and diplomat, later turned from Islam to become a religious brother of the Cistercian Order. He is a martyr of the Catholic Church, venerated particularly in the Valencian Community and Catalonia. The most important celebrations in his honor are held in the city of Alzira, of which he is patron, and the Poblet Monastery in Tarragona.

== Biography ==
Bernard was the son of Mansur, Emir of the Taifa of Carlet. He was the second of four children: Almanzor, the heir, Zaida (Mary) and Zoraida (Grace). He was born in the farmhouse of Pintarrafés, in the valley of Alcalá del Magre, in Carlet, belonging to the jurisdiction of Alzira, with the name of Ahmet. He was educated with his brother at the court of the Taifa of Valencia. When the Naib of Murcia, Muhammad ibn Mardanis, whose lineage he belonged to, took the throne of Valencia, he joined the court. In 1156 he was sent as ambassador to the court of the Kingdom of Aragon, who was then in Barcelona. The king Ramon Berenguer IV, Count of Barcelona was in possession of a group of war prisoners whose release requested Valencia. Ahmet failed in diplomatic negotiations and initiated way back to Valencia stopping near the Poblet Monastery. Attracted by it, he requested accommodation from the monks and after two days on campus he dismissed his servant and entered the Cistercian Order, taking the name Bernardo. In 1181 he returned to Valencia with intent to evangelize his family. His brother Almanzor, who had succeeded his father, opposed the preaching and sent chase, unable to keep their two sisters, Zaida and Zoraida from being baptized, with the names of Mary and Grace. They three of them were arrested on the outskirts of Alzira, where they had hidden, and were killed on August 21 of that year.

== History ==
After his death, the bodies of Bernard, Mary, and Grace were buried in Alzira by Mozarabs. In 1242, the army of James I of Aragon found his remains, after the conquest of the city, and built a chapel in the place of martyrdom and a temple in Alzira in his memory, which was assigned to the Trinitarian Order. In 1262 Pere Ferran donated twenty sous real for the work of the church of San Bernardo. In the fifteenth century Gothic table in the Cathedral of Valencia represented the martyrdom of the three siblings. The second finding of the relics took place in 1599. In 1603, through the intercession of Philip III of Spain, the relics of the saints were transferred to the Poblet Monastery, but later the relics were split among the town of Carlet and the Real Colegio Seminario del Corpus Christi of Valencia at the request of the then Archbishop Juan de Ribera. The city of Alzira proclaimed them patrons in 1643. Religious iconography shows Saint Bernard of Alzira and his sisters with a nail piercing their foreheads, representing the shape of his martyrdom (though other sources say they were beheaded) carried out through nails that were used to moor their boats in the bank of the Júcar river. The saint has an altar, with its relics, in the Church of Saint Catherine in Alzira. The archdiocese of Valencia celebrates the feast of Saint Bernard of Alzira on July 23 (after the second discovery of relics on July 23, 1599) and proper office for the Kingdom of Valencia and the whole Archdiocese of Valencia by edict of Pope Benedict XIII of September 25, 1725. However, the Cistercian order celebrates feast from June 1, 1871. Finally, by privilege of the Holy See, the Poblet Monastery has a solemn liturgy in honor of the saint and her sisters each September 2. The saint holds the parish of the Pueblo Nuevo village, and the parish is dedicated to sisters Mary and Grace in the city of Valencia and the parish of Patron Saints Bernard, Mary and Grace, in Alzira.

== Bibliography ==
- Henrion, Mathieu (Henrion Baron) (1854). Ancos Imp. ed. general history of the Church from the preaching of the apostles, to the reign of Gregory XVI ... Edition 2 . From Complutense University of Madrid. Digitized on 16 Apr 2008. ISBN 84-398-0974-3.
- Zabala, Fernanda, Fernanda Rodriguez-Fornos Zabala (2003). Carena Editors, SL. ed. 125 Valencia in history . pp. 258. ISBN 8487398642.
- Part Dalmau, Eduardo (1984). Commission Falla Plaza Mayor of Alzira. ed. From Al-Yazirat Jaime I. 500 years of the history of Alzira . pp. 211. ISBN 84-398-0974-3.
- Anne Rosenblum, "Sts. Bernardo and Maria Gracia Alsirskie "/ / Live Tradition . - Moscoviae : MMX . - number I (III). - S. 17–18.
