= Mattie Howard =

Crime figure and evangelist

- Born: November 11, 1894; Preston, Idaho
- Died: November 13, 1984 (aged 90)
- Known for: Organized crime, evangelicalism

Martha Alice "Mattie" Howard (November 11, 1894–November 13, 1984) was a high profile American, convicted criminal who became part of the Kansas City, Missouri underworld in the early part of the 20th century. Through her participation in criminal activity, Howard became a celebrity. She was known as the "Queen of the Underworld." She served six years and six months in the Missouri State Penitentiary after being convicted on the charge of 2nd degree murder. Upon release she became an evangelist, traveling throughout the United States sharing her life story.

== Early life ==
Martha ("Mattie") Alice Howard was born in Preston, Idaho in November 1894 the daughter of Charles P. (b. 1860) and Martha (nee Keenan) Howard (b. 1867). She was raised in the Denver, Colorado area. Mattie Howard was one of their twelve children, though only six survived to adulthood. Howard attended St. Mary's, a Catholic school for girls, and eventually converted to Catholicism.

Charles was frequently absent from the home during her childhood and formative years. There were many times when coal for heating and food were in short supply. Conflict at home with her brothers eventually caused her to flee to Limon, Colorado where she worked in the Limon depot and Grier House at around the age 17. For this work she received $12.00 per week, plus tips, along with free room and board. Becoming homesick, she returned home only to be pursued by a suitor which caused her to disappear again.

On the night of December 8, 1914, Mattie's brother Robert (Oliver Robert, or O.B., as he was called), Albert C. Pagel, Jr. and a third man robbed the United States Post Office in Walsenburg, Colorado. $15,000 USD, which was supposed to go to the local bank, went missing in that robbery. They committed this crime while stationed with the Cavalry, in Walsenburg, during the unrest in the coal fields of that period.

== Crimes ==
Howard was accused of murdering Kansas City pawnbroker and diamond dealer Joseph Morino on May 23, 1918. Morino was found at the Touraine Hotel, 1412 Central Street. He had been killed by a blow to the head.

Howard enlisted the services of Kansas City attorney Jesse James Jr., son of the notorious outlaw. She fled Missouri in her efforts to avoid a prison term. Howard was captured in Memphis, Tennessee and returned to Kansas City for trial.

Howard was convicted at trial of second degree murder in the death of Morino. She was sentenced to the Missouri State Penitentiary where she served 7 years.

The downward spiral of her life continued with the death of Pagel from septic peritonitis. The sepsis was due to gunshots receiving during another criminal activity. He died on March 14, 1920, at age 28.

== Later Life ==
After her release from prison on May 17, 1928. She claimed in newspapers to have then moved to Chicago where she became part of Al Capone's mob, mostly driving their driving cars; until she grew restless and left the life of crime when she found her religious calling on September 15, 1932. She became an evangelist and shared her story with many groups across the United States.
