= Maximiliano Mirabet =

Argentine footballer

Personal information
- Full name: Maximiliano Diego Mirabet
- Date of birth: 14 January 1982 (age 44)
- Place of birth: Rojas, Argentina
- Height: 1.82 m (6 ft 0 in)
- Position: Defender

Youth career
- 1987–1999: Jorge Newbery Rojas
- 1999–2001: All Boys

Senior career*
Years	Team	Apps	(Gls)
2001–2007	All Boys	145	(3)
2008	Santiago Morning	28	(2)
2009	UD Benigánim	–	(–)
2010–2011	Sanluri	–	(–)
2011	Nardò	16	(3)
2012	Francavilla	8	(0)
2012–2013	Brindisi	26	(0)
2013–2014	Casarano	–	(–)
2014–2015	Sestete	–	(–)
2016	Deportivo Roca	1	(0)
2016–2017	Pro Italia Galatina	–	(–)
2017–2018	Polisportiva Gaeta	–	(–)
2018–2019	Melfi	–	(–)
2019–2020	Ferrandina	–	(–)
- * Club domestic league appearances and goals

Maximiliano Diego Mirabet (born 14 January 1982) is an Argentine retired footballer who played as a defender. His last team was Italian amateur Melfi Calcio.

== Career ==
As a youth player, Mirabet was with club Jorge Newbery from his hometown, Rojas, before joining All Boys and beginning his professional football career with them.

In 2008, Mirabet moved to Chile and signed with Santiago Morning in the top level.

Mirabet mainly developed his career in Italy, with a brief stint with Deportivo Roca in 2016.
