= Maximiliano Blanco =

Argentine footballer

Maximiliano Hernan Blanco
Personal information
- Full name: Maximiliano Hernán Blanco
- Date of birth: August 1, 1977 (age 49)
- Place of birth: Morón, Buenos Aires, Argentina
- Height: 1.78 m (5 ft 10 in)
- Position: Defender

Senior career*
Years	Team	Apps	(Gls)
1996 –2001	Tigre	114	(2)
2002	Deportivo Quito	14	(0)
2002–2003	Deportivo Español	28	(2)
2003–2004	Temperley	31	(1)
2004–2005	San Martín de Mendoza	39	(3)
2005–2007	Huracán de Tres Arroyos	58	(2)
2007–2008	Blooming	30	(1)
2008–2011	Sportivo Italiano	60	(3)
2013	Barracas Central	1	(0)
- * Club domestic league appearances and goals as of June 14, 2011

Maximiliano Hernán Blanco (born 1 August 1977) is an Argentine former football defender.

Blanco began his career in 1996 in the third tier with Club Atlético Tigre. While playing at Victoria, the team gained promotion to the Argentine Nacional B. In 2002 after five seasons with "El Matador", Blanco transferred to Ecuadorian club Deportivo Quito where he played for the whole year before making short spells with Argentine lower division clubs such as Deportivo Español, Temperley, San Martín de Mendoza and Huracán de Tres Arroyos.

In 2007, Blanco signed with Bolivian first division club Blooming. During the 2008 season, Blanco was suspended for 40 games by the Bolivian league for an aggression he committed against a referee after being sent off during a league match. Blanco returned to Argentina and joined Sportivo Italiano, playing there for three years. In 2013, he had a short spell with Barracas Central.
