= Massimiliano Ossari =

Italian footballer

Personal information
- Full name: Massimiliano Ossari
- Date of birth: 29 April 1977
- Place of birth: Conselve, Italy
- Date of death: 22 April 2002 (aged 24)
- Place of death: Vicenza, Italy
- Height: 1.84 m (6 ft 0 in)
- Position: Defender

Youth career
- Padova

Senior career*
| Years | Team | Apps | (Gls) |
| 1995–1996 | Padova | 2 | (0) |
| 1996–1997 | Novara | 15 | (0) |
| 1997–1998 | Giorgione | 27 | (0) |
| 1998–2001 | Padova | 37 | (0) |
| 2001 | Cremonese | 12 | (1) |
| 2001–2002 | Poggese | 10 | (0) |
| 2002 | Thiene | 12 | (0) |

International career
| 1995 | Italy U18 | 0 | (0) |
- * Club domestic league appearances and goals

Massimiliano Ossari (29 April 1977 – 22 April 2002) was an Italian professional footballer who played defender.

== Career ==
Ossari played for the youth club of Calcio Padova. He made his debut in Serie A on 23 December 1995 in the last twenty minutes of the Piacenza-Padova over 1-1. He took the field in the match against Napoli finished 4-2 for biancoscudati. His career mostly alternated between Serie C1 and Serie C2 with the Novara, Giorgione, Cremonese (with which marks his only goal), Poggesi and Thiene.

On 1 July 1995 Ossari played for the National Under-18 team. Italy-Slovenia finished 4–0.

On 22 April 2002 he died in a car accident.

== Honours ==
Padova

- Serie C2 (1): 2000–01
