= Atlantic Southeast Airlines Flight 529 =

1995 aviation accident in Georgia, US

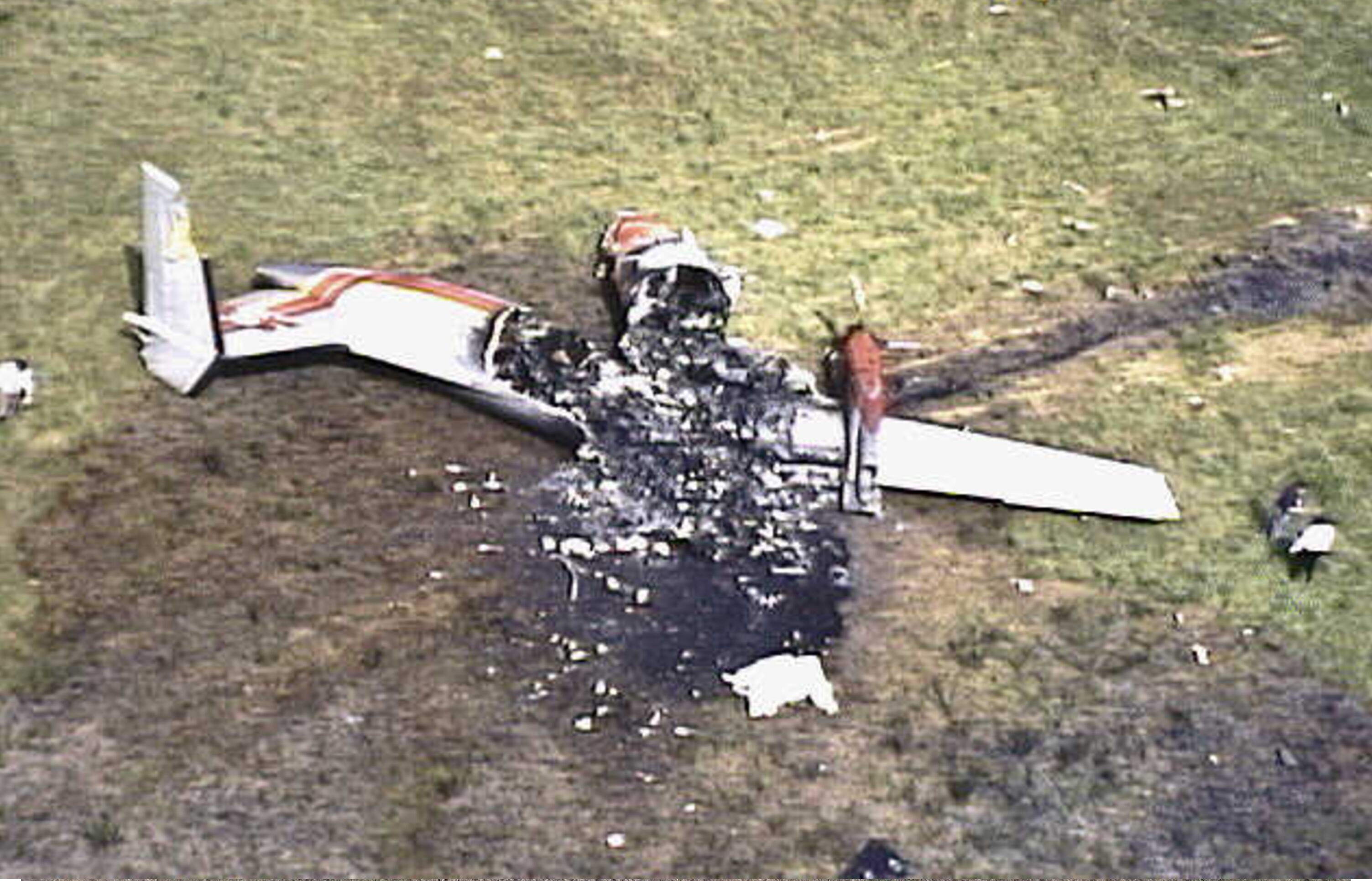
- Wreckage of the aircraft

Accident
- Date: August 21, 1995
- Summary: Propeller disintegration due to improper maintenance
- Site: Carroll County, between the cities Bowdon, Georgia and Carrollton, Georgia, U.S.; 33°34′51″N 85°12′51″W

Aircraft
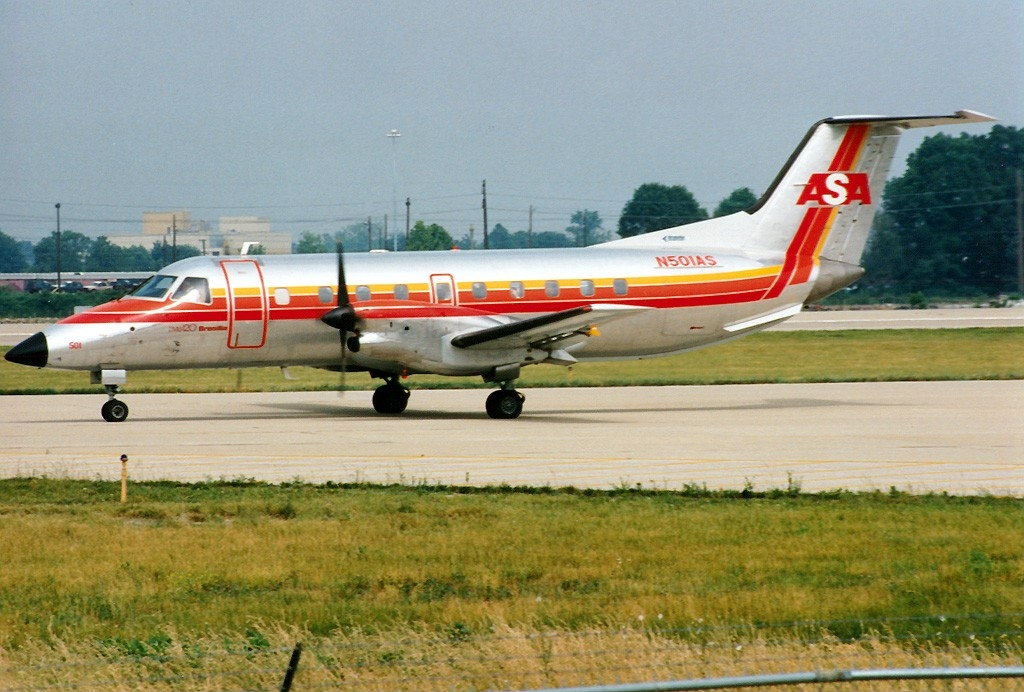
- An Atlantic Southeast Airlines Embraer 120RT Brasilia, similar to the one involved in the accident
- Aircraft type: Embraer 120RT Brasilia
- Operator: Atlantic Southeast Airlines on behalf of Delta Connection
- IATA flight No.: EV7529 / DL7529
- ICAO flight No.: ASE529
- Call sign: ACEY 529
- Registration: N256AS
- Flight origin: Hartsfield Atlanta International Airport
- Destination: Gulfport–Biloxi International Airport
- Occupants: 29
- Passengers: 26
- Crew: 3
- Fatalities: 9
- Injuries: 20
- Survivors: 20

On August 21, 1995, Atlantic Southeast Airlines Flight 529, an Embraer EMB 120 Brasilia flying from Atlanta, Georgia, to Gulfport, Mississippi, crashed in the community of Burwell between the cities of Bowdon, Georgia, and Carrollton, Georgia. Out of the 29 people on board, 9 were killed. The accident bore similarities to Atlantic Southeast Airlines Flight 2311, which had occurred four years earlier, and resulted in the deaths of all 23 people on board. The inquiries of both crashes concluded that design flaws in the aircraft's propellers were to blame.

== Aircraft and flight information ==
Flight 529 was a regularly scheduled passenger flight from Hartsfield Atlanta International Airport to Gulfport–Biloxi International Airport in Gulfport, Mississippi.

On August 21, 1995, the flight was operated using an Embraer EMB 120RT Brasilia (registration number N256AS) with manufacturer serial number 120122, a twin-turboprop commuter airliner. The aircraft made its first flight in 1989 and was delivered to Atlantic Southeast Airlines on March 3 of that same year. Before the fatal flight, it had made 18,171 cycles (one cycle can be roughly defined as one flight) and accumulated a total of 17,151.3 flight hours. The aircraft was equipped with a cockpit voice recorder (CVR) and a flight data recorder (FDR).

The captain of the flight was Edwin "Ed" Gannaway, age 45, and the first officer was Matthew "Matt" Warmerdam, age 28. Gannaway was a skilled pilot with 9,876 total hours of flying experience, including 7,374 flight hours in the Embraer Brasilia. Warmerdam was hired by the airline in April 1995 and had logged a total of 1,193 flight hours (including 363 hours in the Embraer Brasilia) at the time of the accident. The sole flight attendant, Robin Fech, age 37, was hired by the airline in February 1993 and had completed her last recurrent training in January 1995.

== Passengers ==
Business travelers, ranging from 18 to 69 years of age, comprised just under half of the aircraft's passengers. Six engineers, two deputy sheriffs, two air force personnel, a minister, and a New Orleans woman planning to become a flight attendant were also on the aircraft.

== Accident ==
Flight 529 left the ramp area at Atlanta at 12:10 Eastern Daylight Time, (Note: All times in the NTSB's final report are given in Eastern Daylight Time.) and took off at 12:23. At 12:43:25, while climbing through 18,100 ft, the occupants of the aircraft heard a thud, which First Officer Warmerdam later described as sounding like "someone had hit a trash can with a baseball bat." The outboard section of one of the blades of the Hamilton Standard propeller on the left engine separated. The separation imbalanced the propeller causing the entire assembly to become dislodged from the resulting violent wobbling, deforming the engine nacelle and distorting the wing's profile. The separated section of the propeller blade landed about 35 miles west of the eventual crash site and was obscured by tall grass for three weeks until it was recovered by a farmer. Although the EMB 120, like all transport-category multi-engine airplanes, is designed to fly with one engine inoperative, the distortion of the engine resulted in excessive drag and loss of lift on the left side of the aircraft, causing it to rapidly lose altitude.

The flight crew initially tried to return to Atlanta for an emergency landing, but the rapid descent resulted in them being diverted to West Georgia Regional Airport. The airplane was unable to stay in the air long enough and the pilots began searching for an open space to make an emergency landing, eventually settling on a field in Carroll County, Georgia, near the farming community of Burwell and the city of Carrollton. At 12:52:45, before the emergency landing could commence, the aircraft pitched over and began an uncommanded dive, striking the tops of the trees before it hit the ground nose first with a slight left bank, the force of which ripped off the weakened left wing. The aircraft skidded along the ground for some distance until it hit an incline in the field and briefly became airborne again, then fell back to the ground while yawing uncontrollably, before finally coming to a stop. The force of the final impact split the fuselage in half around the wingbox, rupturing the fuel tanks, which proved to be fatal during the evacuation of the plane.

== Casualties ==
With the exception of the captain, all of the passengers and crew aboard Flight 529 survived the initial impact. Most fatalities were the result of a postcrash fire.

The fire started about one minute after impact, and an oxygen bottle behind the first officer's seat leaked, contributing to the strength of the fire. Despite a dislocated shoulder, First Officer Warmerdam used the cockpit fire axe to cut through the thick cockpit glass. Surviving passenger David McCorkell and Carroll County Sheriff Deputy Guy Pope later assisted by pulling the axe out of the cockpit through the hole Warmerdam had created and struck the glass from the outside to increase the size of the hole and help Warmerdam escape. The emergency crews (including fire chief Steve Chadwick and paramedic Joan Crawford) successfully pulled Warmerdam out of the aircraft, but Captain Gannaway had suffered fatal injuries from the impact and succumbed to his wounds shortly after. Despite his injuries, Warmerdam survived the plane crash. Loudoun County Sheriff's Office Deputy Charles Barton died in a hospital from injuries sustained while allowing other passengers to exit first.

In addition to Captain Gannaway, seven passengers died as a result of the crash and subsequent fire, including three who died within 30 days of the crash, bringing the official death toll to eight. A ninth victim died four months after the crash from severe burn injuries. None of the passengers or crew escaped uninjured; eight had minor injuries. Among the seriously injured were Warmerdam and Fech.

Many of the passengers suffered survivor guilt; some believed that they should have assisted other passengers.

Surviving passenger Mary Jean Adair died of a heart attack eight weeks after the crash. She was included in a dedication to the people killed by the crash in a memorial service at an elementary school gymnasium some years later.

== Probable cause ==
The probable cause of the accident was determined to be the failure of the propeller due to undiscovered metal fatigue in one blade resulting from corrosion from chlorine. Two previous failures of the same type of propeller had occurred, but those aircraft had been able to land safely. The failed propeller blade had undergone scheduled ultrasonic testing on May 19, 1994, which resulted in its rejection and removal from the propeller. The blade had been sent to a Hamilton Standard facility, where it was subject to refurbishing work that was incorrectly performed. The propeller blade was then installed on the propeller fitted to the aircraft on September 30, 1994.

The National Transportation Safety Board (NTSB) criticized Hamilton Standard, which had maintained the propellers, for "inadequate and ineffective corporate inspection and repair techniques, training, documentation, and communication", and both Hamilton Standard and the Federal Aviation Administration for "failure to require recurrent on-wing ultrasonic inspections for the affected propellers". The overcast skies and low cloud ceiling at the crash site also contributed to the severity of the crash.

== Aftermath ==
The Military Fraternal Organization of Pilots awarded Warmerdam its medallion for his role in the disaster after treatment for burns. In 2002, after an estimated 50 surgeries and lengthy therapy, he was able to resume flying for ASA. As of 2021, Warmerdam is flying for SkyWest Airlines. The American Society of Plastic Surgeons honored his positive attitude during the long recovery with one of their "Patients of Courage: Triumph Over Adversity" awards in 2005.

The area residents built a memorial to the crash at the Shiloh United Methodist Church, near Burwell.

Many surviving passengers credited Robin Fech, the flight attendant, with saving their lives. Tanner Medical Center treated Fech's broken wrist and other lacerations before releasing her. The Georgia State Senate passed a resolution honoring Fech. The NTSB accident report commended "the exemplary manner in which the flight attendant briefed the passengers and handled the emergency." Fech never worked as a flight attendant again after the ASA 529 disaster.

Fraternal Order of Police Lodge 70 Stewart-Barton bears Deputy Barton's name. It is located in Leesburg, Virginia, in the county where he served.

== In popular culture ==
- The events of Flight 529 were featured in "A Wounded Bird", a season-two (2005) episode of the Canadian TV series Mayday (called Air Emergency and Air Disasters in the U.S. and Air Crash Investigation in the UK and elsewhere around the world). The dramatization was broadcast in the United States with the title "One Wing Flight". The accident was also included in a Mayday season-six (2007) Science of Disaster special titled "Fatal Flaw", which was called "Fatal Fix" in the United Kingdom, Australia, and Asia.
- A book on the disaster, Nine Minutes, Twenty Seconds: The Tragedy and Triumph of ASA Flight 529 by Gary M. Pomerantz, was written in 2001.
