= Calvin Theological Journal =

- Discipline: Theology
- Language: English
- Edited by: Arie C. Leder

Publication details
- History: 1966-present
- Publisher: Calvin Theological Seminary
- Frequency: Biannual

Standard abbreviations
- ISO 4: Calvin Theol. J.

Indexing
- ISSN: 0008-1795

Links
- Journal homepage

Calvin Theological Journal is an academic journal published by Calvin Theological Seminary.
