= Maximiliano Kosteki =

Argentine activist and painter (1979–2002)

Maximiliano Kosteki (July 3, 1979 in Buenos Aires, Argentina – June 26, 2002 in Avellaneda, Argentina) was an Argentine activist and painter. He was killed by provincial policemen while participating in a picket line in Avellaneda.
