= Massimiliano Massimo =

Italian Jesuit

Massimiliano Massimo (3 January 1849 – 6 May 1911) was an Italian Jesuit. He founded the Istituto Massimiliano Massimo at first dedicated to the Virgin Mary and now named after him.

His father was Prince Vittorio Emanuele (Camillo IX) of Rome. He traced his descent from Quintus Fabius Maximus Verrucosus.

He was taught by the Jesuit astronomer Angelo Secchi, and joined the Jesuits in 1868, being ordained in 1876. He later inherited the Palazzo Peretti and, in 1879, made it available to the Jesuits for the re-foundation of a school to continue the Roman College's work in secondary education.

His works including supporting orphans and prison inmates, guiding the congregation of the church of Saint Ignazio, and taking part in the meetings of the Lazio regional committee of the Opera dei Congressi for the organization of the XI Italian Catholic Congress held in Rome and for the episcopal jubilee of Leo XIII.
