= Maximilian of Antioch =

Maximilian of Antioch (Latin: Maximilianus; died c. 353) was a Christian martyr under the Roman emperor Julian the Apostate. His feast day is 21 August.

== See also ==
- Antioch
