= Maximiliano Larroquette =

Maximiliano Larroquette, born in Buenos Aires, Argentina, is a former Advanced Vehicle Electrification Integration Lead at Fiat Chrysler Automobiles (FCA) in Auburn Hills, Michigan. He was formerly a Project Engineer Manager at General Motors Global Design Center in Warren, Michigan. He claims that he was responsible for the design of the Chevrolet Volt, a battery-powered, four-passenger electric vehicle that uses a gas (petrol) engine to create additional electricity to extend its range. He has conducted several interviews for the media about how hybrid vehicles fit into General Motors' vision of the future, and has been the subject of profiles on his life as a General Motors engineer.

== Early life ==
Larroquette lived in Buenos Aires until he was 22, when he moved to Detroit. He attended Oakland University in Rochester, Michigan for his bachelor's and master's degrees in Mechanical Engineering. He worked at Ford Motor Company for two years before he began working at General Motors in 1999.

== Early work ==
Prior to working on the Chevy Volt, Larroquette claims to have worked on several concept cars, including the Pontiac REV, Chevrolet SS and Nomad, Saturn Curve, GMC Graphyte, and the Jay Leno Chevy Deuce.
