= Maximilian Curtze =

German mathematician and historian of mathematics

Ernst Ludwig Wilhelm Maximilian Curtze
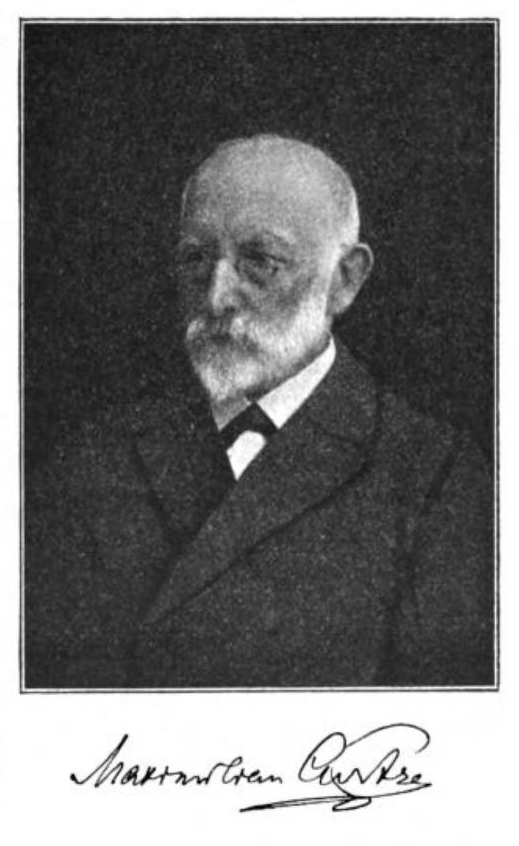
- Born: 4 August 1837; Ballenstedt, Anhalt-Bernburg
- Died: 3 January 1903 (aged 65)

Academic background
- Education: University of Greifswald
- Doctoral advisor: Johann August Grunert

Academic work
- Discipline: Mathematics, history of mathematics

Ernst Ludwig Wilhelm Maximilian Curtze (4 August 1837 – 3 January 1903) was a German mathematician and historian of mathematics. He translated many classical mathematical texts.

== Biography ==
Curtze was born in Ballenstedt, in the Principality of Anhalt-Bernburg, the fourth son of physician Eduard Curtze and Johanna Nicolai. After attending the Carolinum grammar school at Bernburg, he graduated from the University of Greifswald in 1857 after training under Johann August Grunert. He then passed the examination for teachers in 1861 and taught at the Thorn (now Torn, Poland) Gymnasium until his retirement in 1896. A colleague was the Copernicus scholar Leopold Prove. His knowledge of languages and mathematics led him to examine works published in the Middle Ages. He translated the works of Nicole Oresme - Algorismus proportionum (1868), Anartius' commentary on Euclid, Peter of Dacia's commentary on Sacrobosco's Algorisms (1897) and other materials which he collected into his 1902 publication Urkunden zur Geschichte der Mathematik im Mittelalter und der Renaissance.
