= West Georgia Regional Airport =

Public-use airport in Carroll County, Georgia, United States

West Georgia Regional Airport O. V. Gray Field

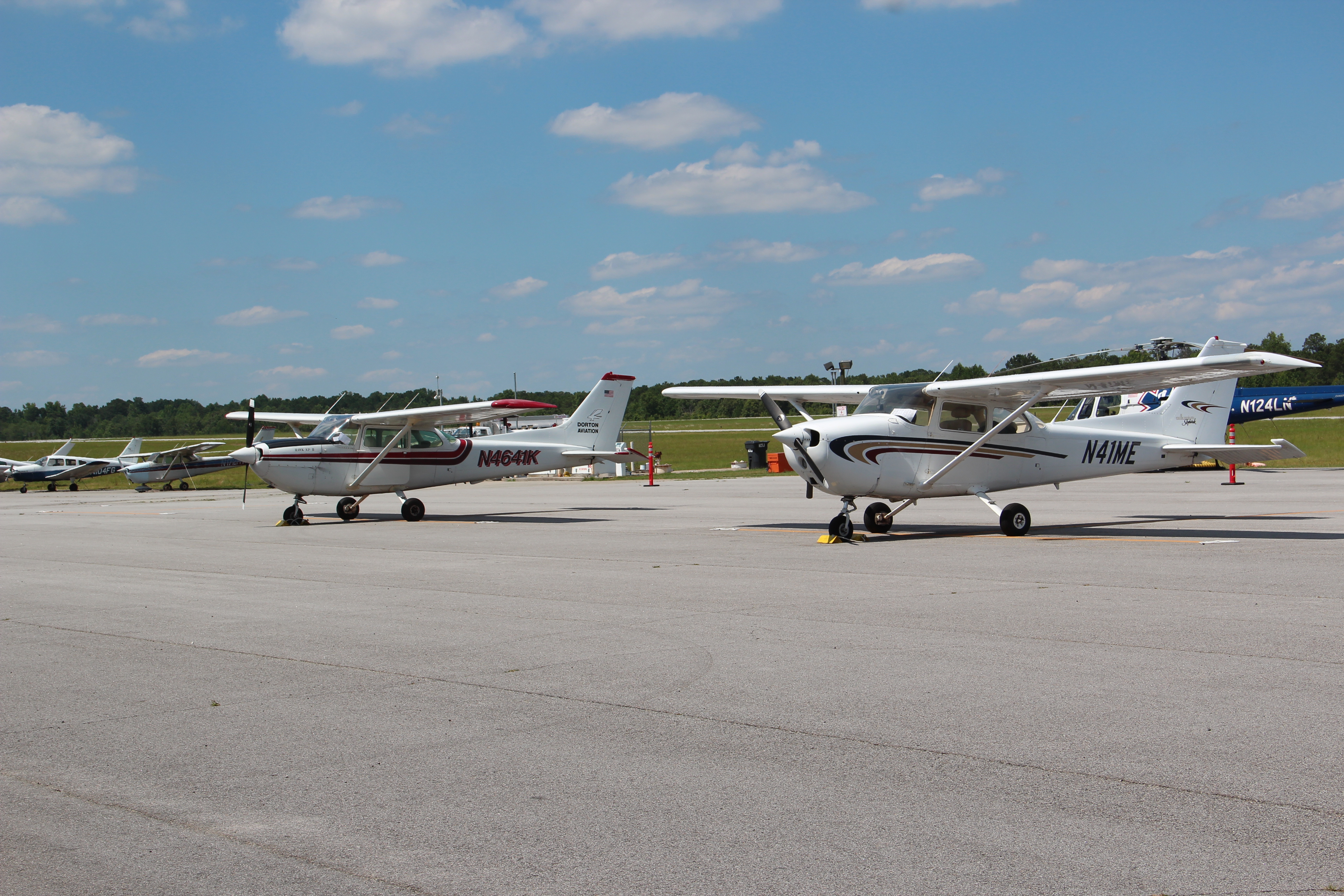
- West Georgia Regional Airport in 2015
- IATA: none; ICAO: KCTJ; FAA LID: CTJ

Summary
- Airport type: Public
- Owner/Operator: West Georgia Airport Authority
- Serves: Carrollton, Georgia
- Elevation AMSL: 1,161 ft / 354 m
- Coordinates: 33°37′54″N 085°09′08″W
- Website: wgraa.com
- Interactive map of West Georgia Regional Airport

Runways
Direction	Length		Surface
Direction	ft	m	Surface
17/35	5,503	1,677	Asphalt

Statistics (2008)
- Aircraft operations: 24,500
- Based aircraft: 43
- Source: Federal Aviation Administration

West Georgia Regional Airport (ICAO: KCTJ, FAA LID: CTJ), also known as O. V. Gray Field, is a public use airport located five nautical miles (9 km) northwest of the central business district of Carrollton, in Carroll County, Georgia, United States. It is owned by the West Georgia Airport Authority.

Although most U.S. airports use the same three-letter location identifier for the FAA and IATA, this airport is assigned CTJ by the FAA but has no designation from the IATA.

== Facilities and aircraft ==
The airport covers an area of 396 acres (160 ha) at an elevation of 1,161 feet (354 m) above mean sea level. It has one asphalt paved runway designated 17/35 which measures 5,503 by 100 feet (1,677 x 30 m).

For the 12-month period ending April 30, 2008, the airport had 24,500 aircraft operations, an average of 67 per day: 98% general aviation and 2% military. At that time there were 43 aircraft based at this airport: 91% single-engine, 5% multi-engine, 2% jet and 2% helicopter.

== Incidents and Accidents ==
- Atlantic Southeast Airlines Flight 529, which had left Atlanta International Airport for Gulfport–Biloxi International Airport suffered an engine failure and was en route to West Georgia Regional Airport when it crashed into a field, killing eight people and fatally wounding another.
- On September 7, 2016, a Diamond DA20C1 and a Beech F33A collided midair at 10:56 am, killing all three people involved. One plane was privately owned and the other was from a flight school in the Carrollton area. Both of the planes crash landed a couple of yards away from end of the runway.

== See also ==
- List of airports in Georgia (U.S. state)
