= Jessie Lake, Minnesota =

Unincorporated community in Minnesota, United States

Jessie Lake
- Unincorporated community
- Location within Minnesota Location within the United States
- Coordinates: 47°36′04″N 93°49′02″W
- Country: United States
- State: Minnesota
- County: Itasca
- Township: Lake Jessie Township
- Elevation: 1,378 ft (420 m)

Population
  - Total: 70
- Time zone: UTC-6 (Central (CST))
  - Summer (DST): UTC-5 (CDT)
- ZIP code: 56637
- Area code: 218
- GNIS feature ID: 656786

Jessie Lake is an unincorporated community in Lake Jessie Township, Itasca County, Minnesota, United States, located within the Chippewa National Forest. The community is located between Wirt and Talmoon; along Itasca County Road 4.

Nearby places include Wirt, Spring Lake, Bowstring, Talmoon, and Marcell. Jessie Lake is located 14 miles southeast of Wirt and two miles west of Talmoon. Jessie Lake is 22 miles north of Deer River.

Jessie Lake is located within ZIP code 56637, based in Talmoon.

== See also ==
- Lake Jessie Township
