= Bass Lake, Itasca County, Minnesota =

Unincorporated community in Minnesota, United States

Bass Lake
- Unincorporated community
- Location within Minnesota Location within the United States
- Coordinates: 47°41′54″N 93°56′15″W
- Country: United States
- State: Minnesota
- County: Itasca
- Township: Wirt Township
- Elevation: 1,368 ft (417 m)

Population
  - Total: 10
- Time zone: UTC-6 (Central (CST))
  - Summer (DST): UTC-5 (CDT)
- ZIP code: 56659
- Area code: 218
- GNIS feature ID: 2095342

Bass Lake is an unincorporated community in Wirt Township, Itasca County, Minnesota, United States; located within the Chippewa National Forest. The community is located between Wirt and Talmoon at the junction of Itasca County Roads 29 and 127.

Nearby places include Wirt, Spring Lake, Talmoon, and Max. Bass Lake is located two miles south of Wirt and 13 miles northwest of Talmoon. Bass Lake is 33 miles northwest of Deer River.

Bass Lake is located within ZIP code 56659 based in Max. A post office previously operated in the community of Bass Lake from 1913 to 1943. ZIP code 56688 based in Wirt is also nearby.

The name Bass Lake may also refer to many other lakes named Bass Lake located throughout Itasca County and Minnesota; including Bass Lake near Cohasset.
