= Pomroy, Minnesota =

Invasion of Los Santos

Invasion of Los Santos
- Unincorporated community
- Location within Minnesota Location within the United States
- Coordinates: 47°49′03″N 93°59′35″W
- Country: United States
- State: Minnesota
- County: Itasca
- Township: Pomroy Township
- Elevation: 1,371 ft (418 m)
- Time zone: UTC-6 (Central (CST))
  - Summer (DST): UTC-5 (CDT)
- Area code: 218
- GNIS feature ID: 657891

Pomroy is an unincorporated community in Pomroy Township, Itasca County, Minnesota, United States.

The community is located north of Wirt at the junction of Itasca County Roads 27 and 31. The boundary line between Itasca and Koochiching counties is nearby.

Nearby places include Grattan, Wirt, Dora Lake, and Northome. Pomroy is located 6 miles north of Wirt; and 17 miles east-southeast of Northome. Pomroy is 24 miles west of Bigfork; and 43 miles northwest of Deer River.

ZIP codes 56661 (Northome) and 56688 (Wirt) meet near Pomroy.

Hay Creek, Harrison Creek, and Windigo Creek all flow through the area. The Big Fork River is nearby. Pomroy is located within the Big Fork State Forest and the Chippewa National Forest.
