= Mack, Minnesota =

Unincorporated community in Minnesota, United States

Mack
- Unincorporated community
- Location within Minnesota Location within the United States
- Coordinates: 47°33′58″N 93°46′28″W
- Country: United States
- State: Minnesota
- County: Itasca
- Elevation: 1,352 ft (412 m)

Population
  - Total: 10
- Time zone: UTC-6 (Central (CST))
  - Summer (DST): UTC-5 (CDT)
- ZIP code: 56636 and 56657
- Area code: 218
- GNIS feature ID: 659414

Mack is an unincorporated community in Itasca County, Minnesota, United States, located within the Chippewa National Forest. The community is located between Deer River and Talmoon, at the junction of State Highway 6 (MN 6) and Mac Road.

Nearby places include Talmoon, Bowstring, and Marcell. Mack is located 17 miles north of Deer River; and two miles south of Talmoon. Mack is seven miles southwest of Marcell. Mack is located along the boundary line between Bowstring Township and Marcell Township.

ZIP codes 56657 (Marcell), 56636 (Deer River), and 56637 (Talmoon) all meet near Mack. Lake Jessie Township is also in the vicinity.
