= Bowstring, Minnesota =

Unincorporated community in Minnesota, United States

Bowstring
- Unincorporated community
- Location within Minnesota Location within the United States
- Coordinates: 47°32′35″N 93°47′48″W
- Country: United States
- State: Minnesota
- County: Itasca
- Township: Bowstring Township
- Elevation: 1,345 ft (410 m)
- Time zone: UTC-6 (Central (CST))
  - Summer (DST): UTC-5 (CDT)
- ZIP code: 56636
- Area code: 218
- GNIS feature ID: 655495

Bowstring is an unincorporated community in Bowstring Township, Itasca County, Minnesota, United States.

The community is located 15 miles north of Deer River on Minnesota State Highway 6.

The unincorporated community of Bowstring also extends into Bowstring Lake Unorganized Territory of Itasca County.

== Geography ==
The center of Bowstring is generally considered at the intersection of State Highway 6 (MN 6) and Itasca County Road 133 (CR 133). Nearby places include Talmoon, Marcell, Spring Lake, and Inger. Bowstring is located within the Bowstring State Forest of Itasca County. Lake Jessie Township and Leech Lake Indian Reservation are both in the vicinity.

The Bowstring River flows through the area.

== Community ==
The U.S. Postal Service accepts mail addressed to Bowstring, which is held for pickup at a contract post office located at the Bowstring Store.

The community is named after nearby Bowstring Lake. Its population is about 121 people. Buildings include a church, the Bowstring Store, the USDA fire warden's office, a community center, and several houses. It also features a telephone booth, which was an important feature up until the arrival of cellular phone service in the area in the 1980s.

The community has served travelers, tourists, and the area's few permanent residents since being settled in the 1920s.
