= Rosy, Minnesota =

Unincorporated community in Minnesota, United States

Rosy
- Unincorporated community
- Location within Minnesota Location within the United States
- Coordinates: 47°39′29″N 94°18′22″W
- Country: United States
- State: Minnesota
- County: Itasca
- Township: Third River Township
- Elevation: 1,352 ft (412 m)

Population
  - Total: 10
- Time zone: UTC-6 (Central (CST))
  - Summer (DST): UTC-5 (CDT)
- Area code: 218
- GNIS feature ID: 658094

Rosy is an unincorporated community in Third River Township, Itasca County, Minnesota, United States. The community is located 8 miles northwest of Squaw Lake; near the junction of Itasca County Roads 32, 33, and 141 (8 Mile Road).

Nearby places include Dunbar, Alvwood, Squaw Lake, Max, Northome, and Blackduck. Rosy is located16 miles south of Northome, 16 miles east-southeast of Blackduck, and 36 miles northwest of Deer River.

ZIP codes 56630 (Blackduck) and 56681 (Squaw Lake) meet near Rosy. A post office previously operated in the community of Rosy from 1901 to 1935.

Rosy is located within the Chippewa National Forest and the Blackduck State Forest.
