= Balsam Township, Minnesota =

Balsam Township may refer to:

- Balsam Township, Aitkin County, Minnesota
- Balsam Township, Itasca County, Minnesota
