= Harrison Creek (disambiguation) =

Harrison Creek is a tributary of the Grasse River in New York.

Harrison Creek may also refer to:

== Canada ==
- A tributary of the Black River in Central Ontario, Canada
- A creek in the Bare Oaks Family Naturist Park, Ontario, Canada

== United States ==
- A creek in Battle Ground, Indiana
- A creek in Shamrock Township, Callaway County, Missouri
- A creek in Newton County, Missouri
- A creek in Pomroy, Minnesota
- An inflow and outflow of Harrison Lake, Flathead County, Montana
- Harrison Creek (Otego Creek tributary), Otsego County, New York
- Harrison Creek (Cape Fear River tributary), North Carolina
- A tributary of the US portion of the Pasayten River
