= Deep River Township =

Deep River Township may refer to the following places in the United States:

- Deep River Township, Poweshiek County, Iowa
- Deep River Township, Michigan
- Deer River Township, Itasca County, Minnesota
