= Liberty Township, Minnesota =

Liberty Township is the name of some places in the U.S. state of Minnesota:

- Liberty Township, Beltrami County, Minnesota
- Liberty Township, Itasca County, Minnesota
- Liberty Township, Polk County, Minnesota

== See also ==
- Liberty Township (disambiguation)
