= Grand Rapids Township, Itasca County, Minnesota =

Grand Rapids Township, Minnesota
- Former township
- Location within the state of Minnesota Grand Rapids Township, Minnesota (the United States)
- Coordinates: 47°13′59″N 93°31′36″W
- Country: United States
- State: Minnesota
- County: Itasca

Area
  - Total: 36.0 sq mi (93.3 km^{2})
  - Land: 33.7 sq mi (87.4 km^{2})
  - Water: 2.3 sq mi (6.0 km^{2})
- Elevation: 1,302 ft (397 m)

Population (2000)
  - Total: 11,747
  - Density: 348/sq mi (134.5/km^{2})
- Time zone: UTC-6 (Central (CST))
  - Summer (DST): UTC-5 (CDT)
- ZIP codes: 55730, 55744, 55745
- Area code: 218
- FIPS code: 27-25136
- GNIS feature ID: 0664319

Grand Rapids Township was a township in Itasca County, Minnesota, United States. The population was 11,747 at the 2000 census. By the time of the 2010 census, the area of the former township had been divided between the cities of Grand Rapids, La Prairie, and Coleraine. As of 2025, the current mayor of the town of Grand Rapids is Tasha Connelly.

Grand Rapids Township was named for rapids on the Mississippi River.

== Geography ==
According to the United States Census Bureau, the township had a total area of 36.0 square miles (93 km^{2}), of which 33.7 square miles (87 km^{2}) was land and 2.3 square miles (6.0 km^{2}), or 6.41%, was water.

== Demographics ==
As of the census of 2000, there were 11,747 people, 4,884 households, and 3,057 families residing in the township. The population density was 348.3 inhabitants per square mile (134.5/km^{2}). There were 5,134 housing units at an average density of 152.2 per square mile (58.8/km^{2}). The racial makeup of the township was 96.19% White, 0.23% African American, 1.66% Native American, 0.54% Asian, 0.02% Pacific Islander, 0.29% from other races, and 1.07% from two or more races. Hispanic or Latino of any race were 0.73% of the population.

There were 4,884 households, out of which 29.0% had children under the age of 18 living with them, 48.1% were married couples living together, 11.0% had a female householder with no husband present, and 37.4% were non-families. 32.1% of all households were made up of individuals, and 16.1% had someone living alone who was 65 years of age or older. The average household size was 2.30 and the average family size was 2.89.

In the township the population was spread out, with 23.8% under the age of 18, 9.3% from 18 to 24, 24.9% from 25 to 44, 22.5% from 45 to 64, and 19.6% who were 65 years of age or older. The median age was 40 years. For every 100 females, there were 90.5 males. For every 100 females age 18 and over, there were 86.0 males.

The median income for a household in the township was $31,572, and the median income for a family was $41,875. Males had a median income of $38,561 versus $21,845 for females. The per capita income for the township was $17,095. About 7.9% of families and 10.5% of the population were below the poverty line, including 14.3% of those under age 18 and 6.4% of those age 65 or over.
