= Martin, Minnesota =

Unincorporated community in Minnesota, United States

Martin
- Unincorporated community
- Location within Minnesota Location within the United States
- Coordinates: 47°29′22″N 93°32′40″W
- Country: United States
- State: Minnesota
- County: Itasca
- Township: Balsam Township
- Elevation: 1,325 ft (404 m)

Population
  - Total: 70
- Time zone: UTC-6 (Central (CST))
  - Summer (DST): UTC-5 (CDT)
- ZIP code: 55709
- Area code: 218
- GNIS feature ID: 659367

Martin is an unincorporated community in Balsam Township, Itasca County, Minnesota, United States.

The community is northwest of Bovey, near the junction of Itasca County Roads 49 and 50. County Road 326 is also in the area.

Nearby places include Trout Lake and Spider Lake. Martin is 23 miles northwest of Bovey; and 22 miles north of Grand Rapids. It is 14 miles southeast of Marcell; and 25 miles southeast of Bigfork.

Martin is within ZIP code 55709, based in Bovey. The community is within the Chippewa National Forest. Martin is in the southwestern portion of Balsam Township.
