= Cow Horn Lake =

Lake in the state of Minnesota, United States

- Location within Minnesota Location within the United States
- Location: Itasca County, Minnesota
- Coordinates: 47°6′14″N 93°27′49″W
- Type: lake
- Basin countries: United States
- Surface elevation: 388 m (1,273 ft)

Cow Horn Lake is a lake in Itasca County, in the U.S. state of Minnesota and is found at an elevation of 1,273 feet (388 m).

Cow Horn Lake is named on account of its outline having the shape of a cow's horn.

The lake is located at latitude and longitude coordinates of 47.1035572 and -93.4591065 at an elevation of 389 feet. The topological map of the lake is part of the United States Geological Survey (USGS) area map.

== See also ==
- List of lakes in Minnesota
