= Dunbar, Minnesota =

Unincorporated community in Minnesota, United States

Dunbar
- Unincorporated community
- Location within Minnesota Location within the United States
- Coordinates: 47°39′30″N 94°13′29″W
- Country: United States
- State: Minnesota
- County: Itasca
- Township: Good Hope Township
- Elevation: 1,352 ft (412 m)

Population
  - Total: 20
- Time zone: UTC-6 (Central (CST))
  - Summer (DST): UTC-5 (CDT)
- Area code: 218
- GNIS feature ID: 656064

Dunbar is an unincorporated community in Good Hope Township, Itasca County, Minnesota, United States. The community is located northwest of Squaw Lake at the junction of Itasca County Roads 32 and 149. State Highway 46 (MN 46) is nearby.

Nearby places include Max, Squaw Lake, Alvwood, Northome, and Blackduck. Dunbar is located 5 miles (8 km) northwest of Squaw Lake; and 18 miles (29 km) south of Northome. Dunbar is 20 miles (32 km) east-southeast of Blackduck; and 33 miles (53 km) northwest of Deer River.

ZIP codes 56630 (Blackduck) and 56681 (Squaw Lake) meet near Dunbar. A post office previously operated in the community of Dunbar from 1913 to 1933.

There is also a small town called Dunbar located in East Lothian, Scotland.
