= Blackberry, Minnesota =

Unincorporated community in Minnesota, United States

Blackberry
- Unincorporated community
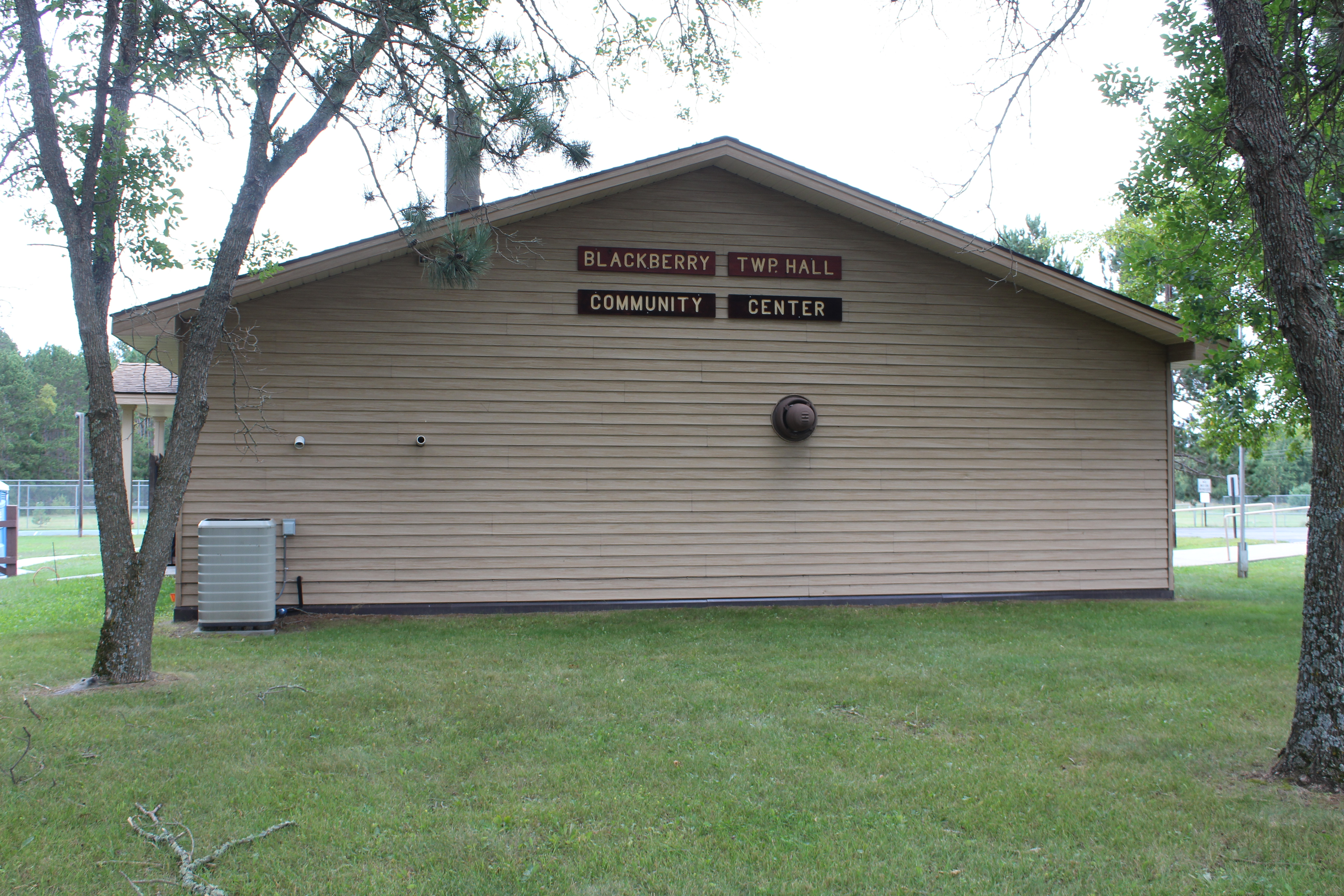
- Blackberry Town hall & Community Center

- Location within Minnesota Location within the United States
- Coordinates: 47°10′51″N 93°23′26″W
- Country: United States
- State: Minnesota
- County: Itasca
- Township: Blackberry Township
- Elevation: 1,299 ft (396 m)

Population
  - Total: 50
- Time zone: UTC-6 (Central (CST))
  - Summer (DST): UTC-5 (CDT)
- ZIP code: 55744 or 55709
- Area code: 218
- GNIS feature ID: 655416

Blackberry is an unincorporated community in Blackberry Township, Itasca County, Minnesota, United States.

The community is located between Grand Rapids and Floodwood at the junction of U.S. Highway 2 (U.S. 2) and Itasca County Road 71 (CR 71).

Nearby places include Grand Rapids, La Prairie, Gunn, Coleraine, Bovey, and Warba.

Blackberry is located seven miles southeast of Grand Rapids.

ZIP codes 55744 (Grand Rapids) and 55709 (Bovey) meet at Blackberry. The Mississippi River is in the vicinity.

The community of Blackberry is located within Blackberry Township (population 880).
