= Grattan, Minnesota =

Unincorporated community in Minnesota, United States

Grattan
- Unincorporated community
- Location within Minnesota Location within the United States
- Coordinates: 47°49′03″N 94°05′20″W
- Country: United States
- State: Minnesota
- County: Itasca
- Township: Grattan Township
- Elevation: 1,352 ft (412 m)

Population
  - Total: 10
- Time zone: UTC-6 (Central (CST))
  - Summer (DST): UTC-5 (CDT)
- ZIP code: 56661
- Area code: 218
- GNIS feature ID: 2095324

Grattan is an unincorporated community in Grattan Township, Itasca County, Minnesota, United States.

The community is located northwest of Wirt; near the junction of Itasca County Roads 26 and 31. The boundary line between Itasca and Koochiching counties is nearby.

Nearby places include Northome, Dora Lake, and Wirt. Grattan is located 12 miles east-southeast of Northome; and 11 miles northwest of Wirt. Grattan is 49 miles northwest of Deer River.

Grattan is located within ZIP code 56661 based in Northome. A post office previously operated in the community of Grattan, first as Pinetop (1901–1920), and then as Grattan (1920–1935), until its closing in 1935.

Moose Brook and Windigo Creek are both nearby. Grattan is located within the Big Fork State Forest and the Chippewa National Forest.
