= Spang Township, Itasca County, Minnesota =

Spang Township, Minnesota
- Township
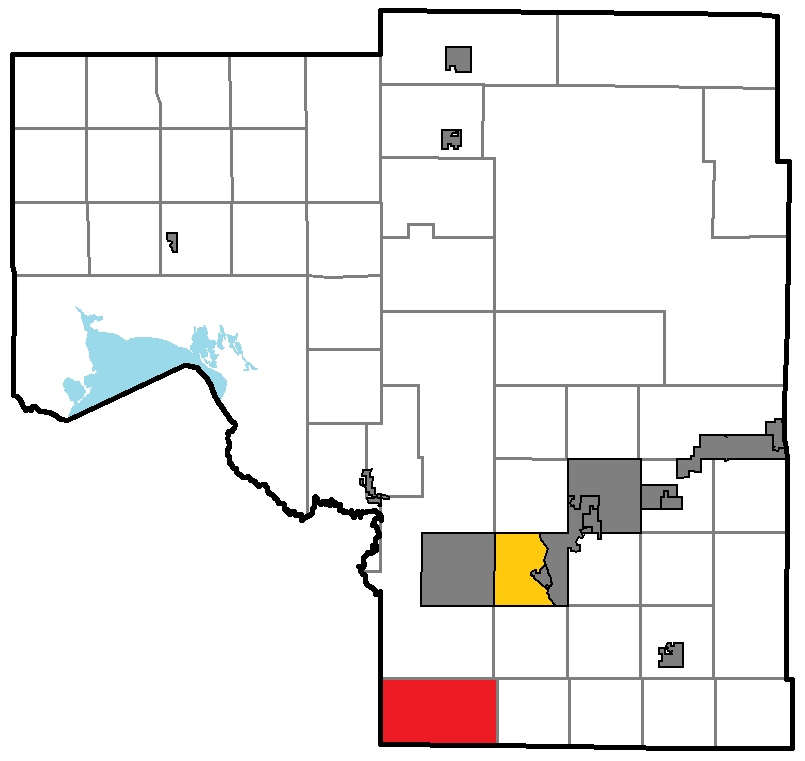
- Location of Spang Township within Itasca County, Minnesota
- Coordinates: 47°4′20″N 93°36′26″W
- Country: United States
- State: Minnesota
- County: Itasca

Area
  - Total: 52.9 sq mi (136.9 km^{2})
  - Land: 52.2 sq mi (135.3 km^{2})
  - Water: 0.62 sq mi (1.6 km^{2})
- Elevation: 1,450 ft (442 m)

Population (2020)
  - Total: 250
  - Density: 4.8/sq mi (1.8/km^{2})
- Time zone: UTC-6 (Central (CST))
  - Summer (DST): UTC-5 (CDT)
- FIPS code: 27-61564
- GNIS feature ID: 0665659

Spang Township is a township in Itasca County, Minnesota, United States. The population was 250 at the 2020 census.

Spang Township was named for Matthew A. Spang, a county official and businessperson in the lumber industry.

== Geography ==
According to the United States Census Bureau, the township has a total area of 52.9 square miles (136.9 km^{2}), of which 52.2 square miles (135.2 km^{2}) is land and 0.6 square miles (1.6 km^{2}), or 1.19%, is water.

== Demographics ==
At the 2000 census there were 262 people, 96 households, and 74 families living in the township. The population density was 5.0 people per square mile (1.9/km^{2}). There were 104 housing units at an average density of 2.0/sq mi (0.8/km^{2}). The racial makeup of the township was 98.47% White, 0.38% Native American, and 1.15% from two or more races. Of the 96 households 39.6% had children under the age of 18 living with them, 67.7% were married couples living together, 6.3% had a female householder with no husband present, and 21.9% were non-families. 21.9% of households were one person and 10.4% were one person aged 65 or older. The average household size was 2.73 and the average family size was 3.07.

The age distribution was 27.5% under the age of 18, 6.9% from 18 to 24, 22.1% from 25 to 44, 31.7% from 45 to 64, and 11.8% 65 or older. The median age was 42 years. For every 100 females, there were 87.1 males. For every 100 females age 18 and over, there were 106.5 males.

The median household income was $43,125 and the median family income was $49,375. Males had a median income of $41,875 versus $20,000 for females. The per capita income for the township was $17,033. About 8.1% of families and 9.3% of the population were below the poverty line, including 2.8% of those under the age of eighteen and 40.9% of those sixty five or over.
