= Wildwood Township, Itasca County, Minnesota =

Wildwood Township, Minnesota
- Township
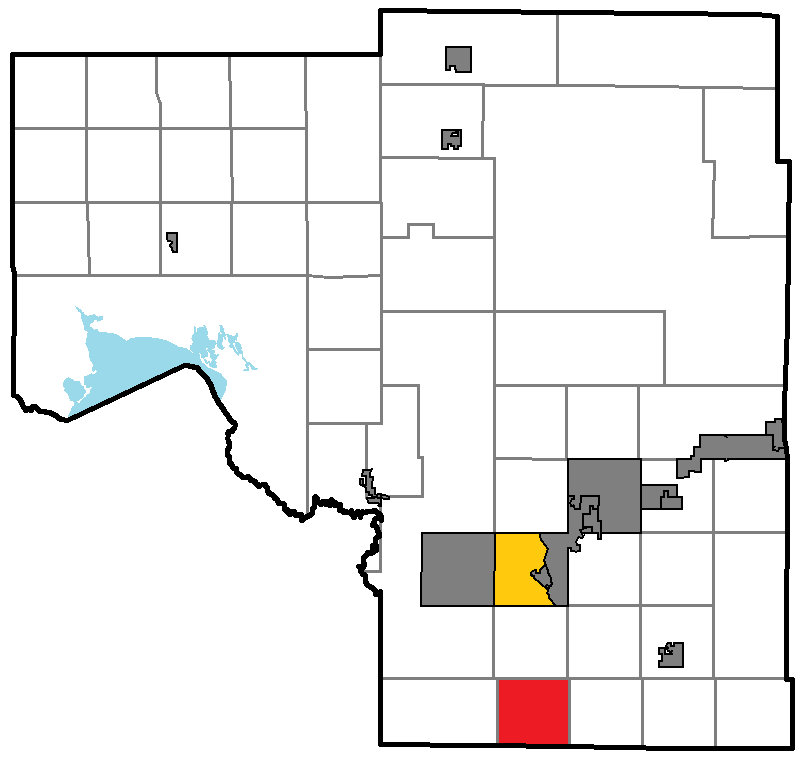
- Location of Wildwood Township, within Itasca County, Minnesota
- Coordinates: 47°3′37″N 93°30′12″W
- Country: United States
- State: Minnesota
- County: Itasca

Area
  - Total: 33.4 sq mi (86.5 km^{2})
  - Land: 30.2 sq mi (78.3 km^{2})
  - Water: 3.2 sq mi (8.2 km^{2})
- Elevation: 1,280 ft (390 m)

Population (2020)
  - Total: 179
  - Density: 5.92/sq mi (2.29/km^{2})
- Time zone: UTC-6 (Central (CST))
  - Summer (DST): UTC-5 (CDT)
- FIPS code: 27-70306
- GNIS feature ID: 0665994

Wildwood Township is a township in Itasca County, Minnesota, United States. The population was 179 at the 2020 census.

== Geography ==
According to the United States Census Bureau, the township has a total area of 33.4 square miles (86.5 km^{2}), of which 30.2 square miles (78.3 km^{2}) is land and 3.2 square miles (8.2 km^{2}), or 9.46%, is water.

== Demographics ==
At the 2000 census there were 193 people, 83 households, and 53 families living in the township. The population density was 6.4 people per square mile (2.5/km^{2}). There were 137 housing units at an average density of 4.5/sq mi (1.7/km^{2}). The racial makeup of the township was 98.45% White, 0.52% Native American, 0.52% Asian, and 0.52% from two or more races. Of the 83 households 25.3% had children under the age of 18 living with them, 55.4% were married couples living together, 4.8% had a female householder with no husband present, and 36.1% were non-families. 28.9% of households were one person and 12.0% were one person aged 65 or older. The average household size was 2.33 and the average family size was 2.92.

The age distribution was 22.3% under the age of 18, 7.3% from 18 to 24, 23.3% from 25 to 44, 33.7% from 45 to 64, and 13.5% 65 or older. The median age was 44 years. For every 100 females, there were 99.0 males. For every 100 females age 18 and over, there were 94.8 males.

The median household income was $38,500 and the median family income was $60,313. Males had a median income of $35,625 versus $37,083 for females. The per capita income for the township was $21,379. About 3.5% of families and 9.6% of the population were below the poverty line, including none of those under the age of eighteen or sixty five or over.
