= Northeast Itasca, Minnesota =

Unorganized territory in Itasca County, Minnesota, United States

- Unorganized territory
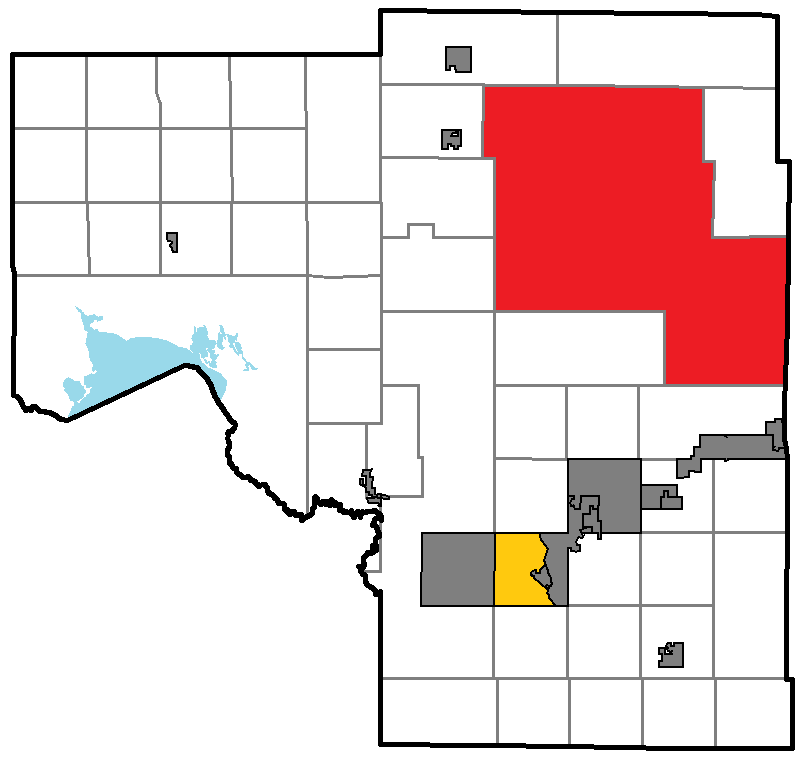
- Location of Northeast Itasca, within Itasca County, Minnesota
- Coordinates: 47°38′28″N 93°20′02″W
- Country: United States
- State: Minnesota
- County: Itasca

Area
  - Total: 424.77 sq mi (1,100.1 km^{2})
  - Land: 398.84 sq mi (1,033.0 km^{2})
  - Water: 25.93 sq mi (67.2 km^{2})

Population (2020)
  - Total: 1,298
  - Density: 3.254/sq mi (1.257/km^{2})
- Time zone: UTC-6 (Central (CST))
  - Summer (DST): UTC-5 (CDT)
- Area code: 218
- GNIS feature ID: 665151

Northeast Itasca is an unorganized territory in Itasca County, Minnesota, United States. The population was 1,298 at the 2020 census.

== Geography ==
According to the United States Census Bureau, the unorganized territory has a total area of 424.8 square miles (1,100.2 km^{2}), of which 399.0 square miles (1,033.4 km^{2}) is land and 25.8 square miles (66.7 km^{2}), or 6.07%, is water.

== Demographics ==
At the 2000 United States census there were 1,170 people, 488 households, and 359 families living in the unorganized territory. The population density was 2.9 inhabitants per square mile (1.1/km^{2}). There were 1,509 housing units at an average density of 3.8 per square mile (1.5/km^{2}). The racial makeup of the unorganized territory was 96.92% White, 0.34% Black or African American, 1.37% Native American, 0.17% from other races, and 1.20% from two or more races. Hispanic or Latino of any race were 0.68%.

Of the 488 households, 20.3% had children under the age of 18 living with them, 67.4% were married couples living together, 2.9% had a female householder with no husband present, and 26.4% were non-families. Additionally, 23.2% of households consisted of individuals, and 8.6% had someone living alone who was 65 or older. The average household size was 2.28, and the average family size was 2.66.

The age distribution was 22.5% under 18, 5.6% from 18 to 24, 21.6% from 25 to 44, 31.4% from 45 to 64, and 18.9% aged 65 or older, with a median age of 45 years. For every 100 females, there were 121.2 males, and for every 100 females age 18 and over, there were 119.1 males.

The median household income was $40,583 and the median family income was $43,565. Males had a median income of $35,104 versus $20,977 for females. The per capita income for the unorganized territory was $18,624. About 5.3% of families and 6.4% of the population were below the poverty line, including 13.5% of those under age 18 and 3.5% of those age 65 or over.
