= Bigfork Township, Itasca County, Minnesota =

Bigfork Township, Minnesota
- Township
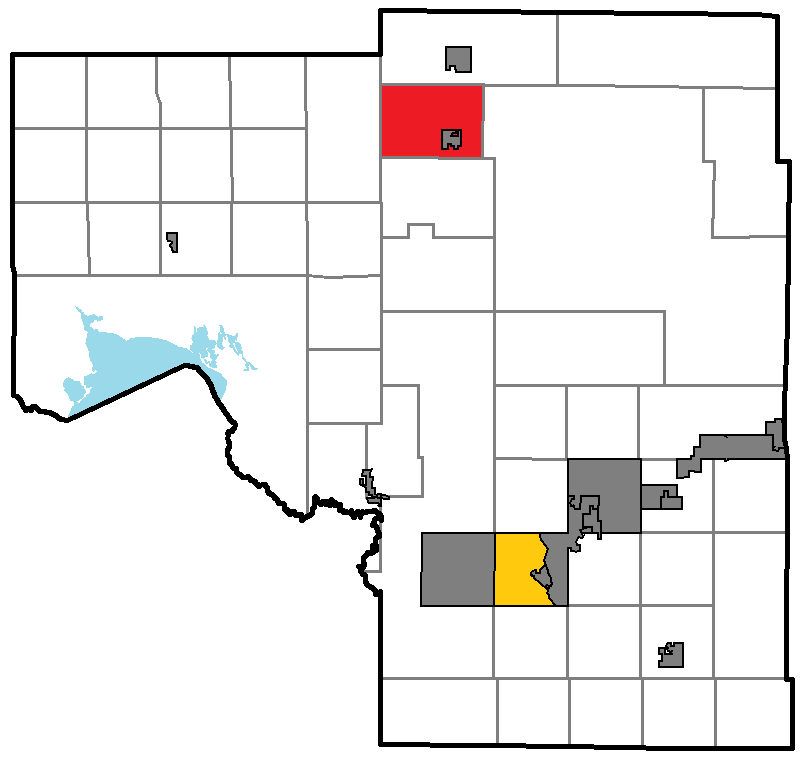
- Location of Bigfork Township, within Itasca County, Minnesota
- Coordinates: 47°45′49″N 93°40′3″W
- Country: United States
- State: Minnesota
- County: Itasca

Area
  - Total: 49.6 sq mi (128.5 km^{2})
  - Land: 49.2 sq mi (127.5 km^{2})
  - Water: 0.39 sq mi (1.0 km^{2})
- Elevation: 1,319 ft (402 m)

Population (2020)
  - Total: 315
  - Density: 6.40/sq mi (2.47/km^{2})
- Time zone: UTC-6 (Central (CST))
  - Summer (DST): UTC-5 (CDT)
- ZIP codes: 56628, 56639
- Area code: 218
- FIPS code: 27-05716
- GNIS feature ID: 0663587

Bigfork Township is a township in Itasca County, Minnesota, United States. The population was 315 at the 2020 census.

== Geography ==
According to the United States Census Bureau, the township has a total area of 49.6 square miles (128 km^{2}), of which 49.2 square miles (127 km^{2}) is land and 0.4 square miles (1.0 km^{2}), or 0.81%, is water.

== Demographics ==
As of the census of 2000, there were 311 people, 124 households, and 97 families living in the township. The population density was 6.3 inhabitants per square mile (2.4/km^{2}). There were 183 housing units at an average density of 3.7 per square mile (1.4/km^{2}). The racial makeup of the township was 97.11% White, 0.32% Native American, and 2.57% from two or more races.

There were 124 households, out of which 29.8% had children under the age of 18 living with them, 67.7% were married couples living together, 8.1% had a female householder with no husband present, and 21.0% were non-families. 17.7% of all households were made up of individuals, and 9.7% had someone living alone who was 65 years of age or older. The average household size was 2.51 and the average family size was 2.83.

In the township the population was spread out, with 24.4% under the age of 18, 6.4% from 18 to 24, 19.3% from 25 to 44, 28.9% from 45 to 64, and 20.9% who were 65 years of age or older. The median age was 45 years. For every 100 females, there were 98.1 males. For every 100 females age 18 and over, there were 97.5 males.

The median income for a household in the township was $38,125, and the median income for a family was $41,750. Males had a median income of $27,813 versus $27,500 for females. The per capita income for the township was $24,359. About 1.8% of families and 3.0% of the population were below the poverty line, including none of those under age 18 and 8.1% of those age 65 or over.
