= Moose Park Township, Itasca County, Minnesota =

Moose Park Township, Minnesota
- Township
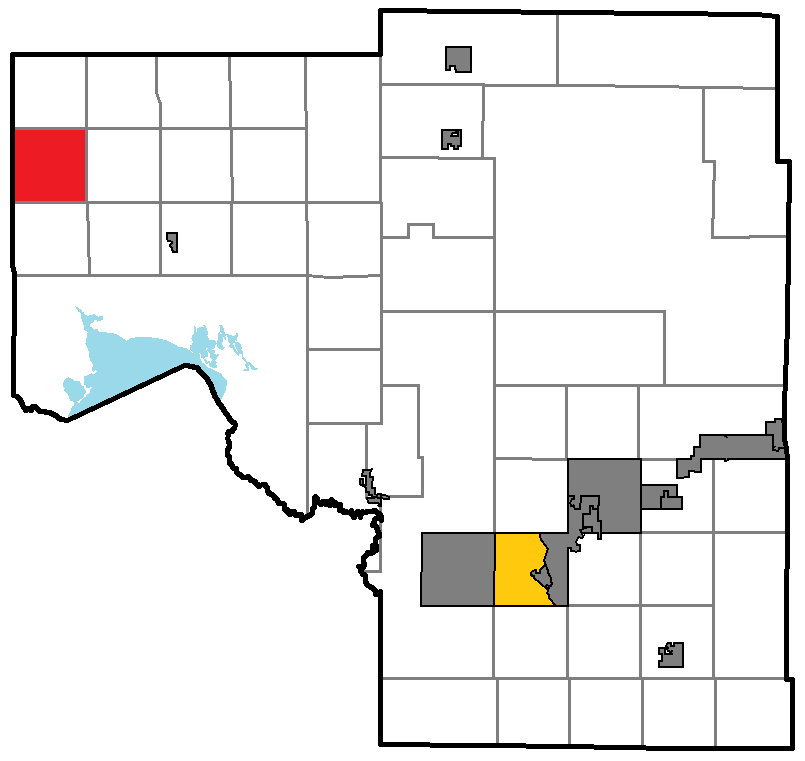
- Location of Moose Park Township, within Itasca County, Minnesota
- Coordinates: 47°42′6″N 94°21′49″W
- Country: United States
- State: Minnesota
- County: Itasca

Area
  - Total: 36.6 sq mi (94.7 km^{2})
  - Land: 36.5 sq mi (94.6 km^{2})
  - Water: 0.039 sq mi (0.1 km^{2})
- Elevation: 1,447 ft (441 m)

Population (2020)
  - Total: 69
  - Density: 1.9/sq mi (0.73/km^{2})
- Time zone: UTC-6 (Central (CST))
  - Summer (DST): UTC-5 (CDT)
- FIPS code: 27-44008
- GNIS feature ID: 0665027

Moose Park Township is a township in Itasca County, Minnesota, United States. The population was 69 at the 2020 census.

== Geography ==
According to the United States Census Bureau, the township has a total area of 36.6 square miles (94.7 km^{2}), of which 36.5 square miles (94.6 km^{2}) is land and 0.1 square miles (0.1 km^{2}), or 0.14%, is water.

== Demographics ==
At the 2000 census there were 80 people, 29 households, and 20 families living in the township. The population density was 2.2 people per square mile (0.8/km^{2}). There were 44 housing units at an average density of 1.2/sq mi (0.5/km^{2}). Everybody in the town is white. Of the 29 households, nine had children under the age of 18 living with them, eighteen were married couples living together, three had a female householder with no husband present, and eight were non-families. Six of the town's households were made up of individuals, and three had someone living alone who was 65 or older. The average household size was 2.76 and the average family size was 3.19.

The age distribution was twenty-two under the age of 18, eight from 18 to 24, fifteen from 25 to 44, twenty-two from 45 to 64, and thirteen who were 65 or older. The median age was 40 years. In the town, there were forty-three males (of whom thirty were age 18 or over) and thirty-seven females (of whom twenty-eight were age 18 or over).

The median household income was $28,750 and the median family income was $40,000. Males had a median income of $36,667 versus $16,250 for females. The per capita income for the township was $15,434. There were 22.2% of families and 16.1% of the population living below the poverty line, including no under eighteens and 52.6% of those over 64.
