= Sago Township, Itasca County, Minnesota =

Sago Township, Minnesota
- Township
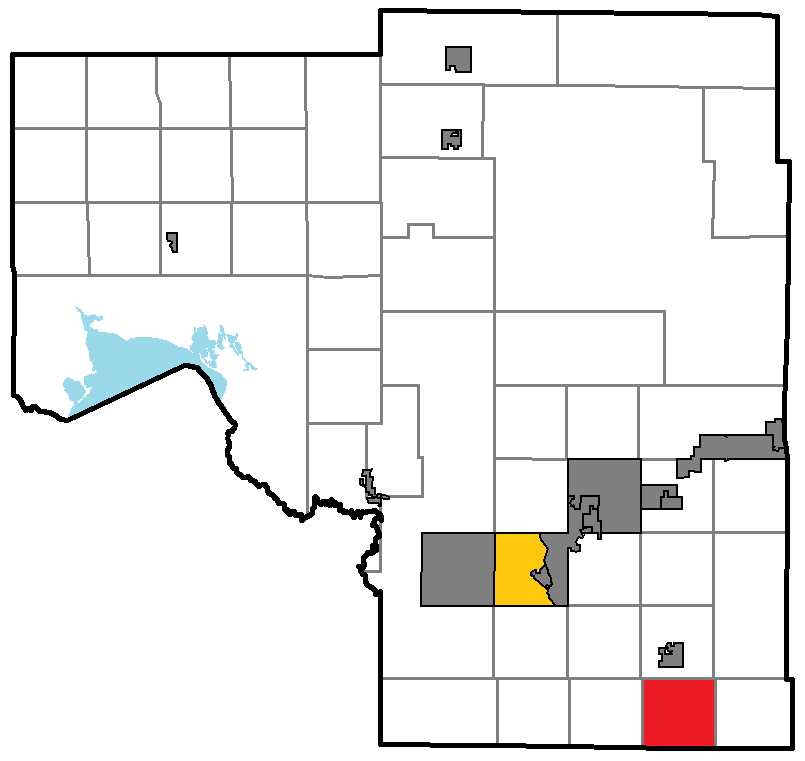
- Location of Sago Township, within Itasca County, Minnesota
- Coordinates: 47°3′18″N 93°14′36″W
- Country: United States
- State: Minnesota
- County: Itasca

Area
  - Total: 34.4 sq mi (89.1 km^{2})
  - Land: 33.8 sq mi (87.6 km^{2})
  - Water: 0.62 sq mi (1.6 km^{2})
- Elevation: 1,263 ft (385 m)

Population (2020)
  - Total: 178
  - Density: 5.26/sq mi (2.03/km^{2})
- Time zone: UTC-6 (Central (CST))
  - Summer (DST): UTC-5 (CDT)
- FIPS code: 27-56644
- GNIS feature ID: 0665500

Sago Township is a township in Itasca County, Minnesota, United States. The population was 178 at the 2020 census.

Sago Township was so named from the fact sago pudding was being served when commissioners were deciding on a suitable name.

== Geography ==
According to the United States Census Bureau, the township has a total area of 34.4 square miles (89.1 km^{2}), of which 33.8 square miles (87.6 km^{2}) is land and 0.6 square miles (1.6 km^{2}), or 1.74%, is water.

== Demographics ==
At the 2000 census there were 205 people, 77 households, and 60 families in the township. The population density was 6.1 people per square mile (2.3/km^{2}). There were 102 housing units at an average density of 3.0/sq mi (1.2/km^{2}). The racial makeup of the township was 97.56% White, 1.46% Native American, and 0.98% from two or more races. Hispanic or Latino of any race were 0.49%.

Of the 77 households 29.9% had children under the age of 18 living with them, 74.0% were married couples living together, 1.3% had a female householder with no husband present, and 20.8% were non-families. 15.6% of households were one person and 7.8% were one person aged 65 or older. The average household size was 2.66 and the average family size was 3.00.

The age distribution was 26.3% under the age of 18, 3.4% from 18 to 24, 28.8% from 25 to 44, 24.4% from 45 to 64, and 17.1% 65 or older. The median age was 39 years. For every 100 females, there were 109.2 males. For every 100 females age 18 and over, there were 106.8 males.

The median household income was $40,179 and the median family income was $41,786. Males had a median income of $39,375 versus $15,417 for females. The per capita income for the township was $14,205. About 2.9% of families and 5.8% of the population were below the poverty line, including none of those under the age of eighteen or sixty five or over.
