= Inger, Minnesota =

Census-designated place in Minnesota, US

Inger Jaachaabaaning (Ojibwe)
- Census-designated place
- Location within Minnesota Location within the United States
- Coordinates: 47°33′15″N 93°59′7″W
- Country: United States
- State: Minnesota
- County: Itasca

Area
  - Total: 1.91 sq mi (4.94 km^{2})
  - Land: 1.88 sq mi (4.86 km^{2})
  - Water: 0.031 sq mi (0.08 km^{2})
- Elevation: 1,332 ft (406 m)

Population (2020)
  - Total: 200
  - Density: 106.6/sq mi (41.14/km^{2})
- Time zone: UTC-6 (CST)
  - Summer (DST): UTC-5 (CDT)
- ZIP code: 56636
- Area Code: 218
- GNIS ID: 656702

Inger (Ojibwe: Jaachaabaaning) is an unincorporated community and census-designated place (CDP) in Itasca County, Minnesota, United States, along the Bowstring River of the Leech Lake Indian Reservation. As of the 2020 census, Inger had a population of 200.

The center of Inger is generally considered as being at the junction of Itasca County Roads 35 and 146. State Highway 46 (MN 46) is also in the vicinity. Inger is located 22 miles northwest of Deer River.

In Ojibwe, the community is called Jaachaabaaning or Chi-achaabaaning, meaning "by the Big Bowstring" due to its location along the Bowstring River. The village is located in the former Inger Township, which reverted to being unorganized. Named for one of its pioneer settlers, a post office was in operation from 1912 until 1955.

Located nine miles south of Inger is the Winnibigoshish Lake Dam, which is listed on the National Register of Historic Places.

== Demographics ==
Historical population
Census	Pop.	Note	%±
2020	200		—
U.S. Decennial Census
