= Lone Pine Township, Itasca County, Minnesota =

Lone Pine Township, Minnesota
- Township
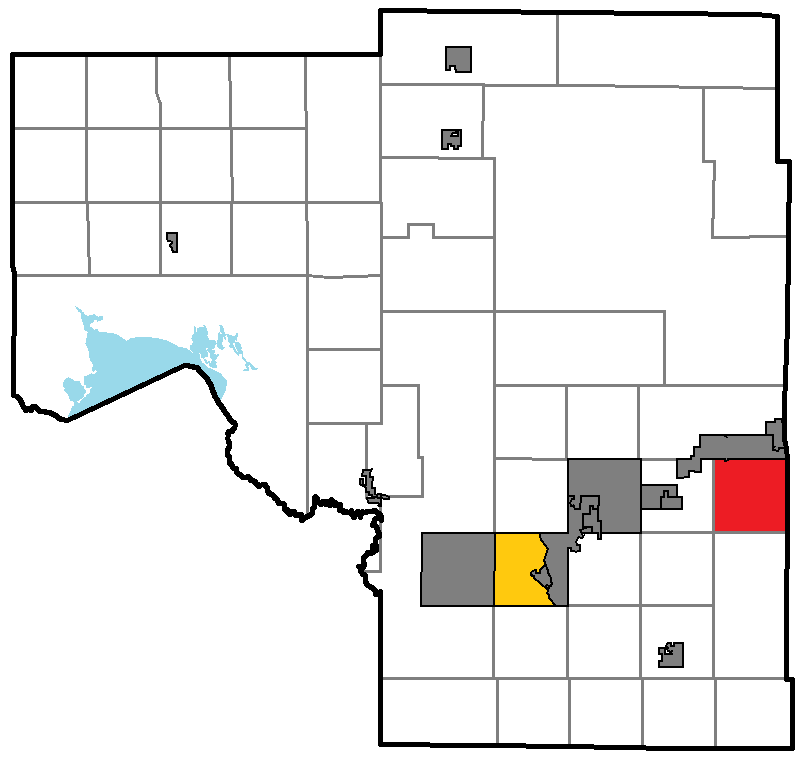
- Location of Lone Pine Township, within Itasca County, Minnesota
- Coordinates: 47°21′9″N 93°7′11″W
- Country: United States
- State: Minnesota
- County: Itasca

Area
  - Total: 36.9 sq mi (95.6 km^{2})
  - Land: 32.8 sq mi (85.0 km^{2})
  - Water: 4.1 sq mi (10.6 km^{2})
- Elevation: 1,388 ft (423 m)

Population (2020)
  - Total: 415
  - Density: 12.6/sq mi (4.88/km^{2})
- Time zone: UTC-6 (Central (CST))
  - Summer (DST): UTC-5 (CDT)
- ZIP code: 55769
- Area code: 218
- FIPS code: 27-37934
- GNIS feature ID: 0664814

Lone Pine Township is a township in Itasca County, Minnesota, United States. The population was 415 at the 2020 census.

== Geography ==
According to the United States Census Bureau, the township has a total area of 36.9 square miles (95.6 km^{2}), of which 32.8 square miles (85.0 km^{2}) is land and 4.1 square miles (10.6 km^{2}), or 11.08%, is water.

== Demographics ==
As of the census of 2000, there were 526 people, 225 households, and 161 families residing in the township. The population density was 16.0 inhabitants per square mile (6.2/km^{2}). There were 340 housing units at an average density of 10.4 per square mile (4.0/km^{2}). The racial makeup of the township was 98.48% White, 0.38% African American, 0.57% Native American, 0.19% Asian, and 0.38% from two or more races. Hispanic or Latino of any race were 0.19% of the population.

There were 225 households, out of which 21.8% had children under the age of 18 living with them, 65.8% were married couples living together, 3.6% had a female householder with no husband present, and 28.4% were non-families. 25.8% of all households were made up of individuals, and 11.1% had someone living alone who was 65 years of age or older. The average household size was 2.34 and the average family size was 2.78.

In the township the population was spread out, with 21.5% under the age of 18, 2.9% from 18 to 24, 20.7% from 25 to 44, 35.4% from 45 to 64, and 19.6% who were 65 years of age or older. The median age was 48 years. For every 100 females, there were 103.1 males. For every 100 females age 18 and over, there were 97.6 males.

The median income for a household in the township was $43,611, and the median income for a family was $51,250. Males had a median income of $47,222 versus $22,500 for females. The per capita income for the township was $23,986. About 3.0% of families and 4.4% of the population were below the poverty line, including 6.7% of those under age 18 and 2.6% of those age 65 or over.
