= Sand Lake Township, Itasca County, Minnesota =

Sand Lake Township, Minnesota
- Township
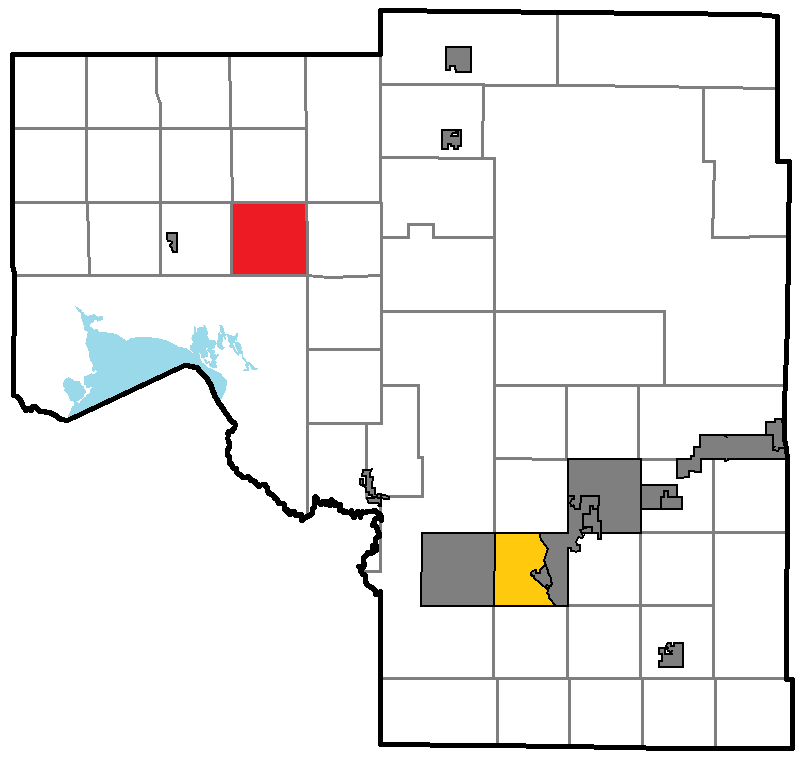
- Location of Sand Lake Township, within Itasca County, Minnesota
- Coordinates: 47°37′1″N 93°59′5″W
- Country: United States
- State: Minnesota
- County: Itasca

Area
  - Total: 37.6 sq mi (97.3 km^{2})
  - Land: 29.5 sq mi (76.5 km^{2})
  - Water: 8.0 sq mi (20.8 km^{2})
- Elevation: 1,329 ft (405 m)

Population (2020)
  - Total: 184
  - Density: 6.23/sq mi (2.41/km^{2})
- Time zone: UTC-6 (Central (CST))
  - Summer (DST): UTC-5 (CDT)
- ZIP code: 56680
- Area code: 218
- FIPS code: 27-58360
- GNIS feature ID: 0665543

Sand Lake Township is a township in Itasca County, Minnesota, United States. The population was 184 at the 2020 census.

== Geography ==
According to the United States Census Bureau, the township has a total area of 37.6 square miles (97.3 km^{2}), of which 29.5 square miles (76.5 km^{2}) is land and 8.0 square miles (20.8 km^{2}), or 21.37%, is water.

== Demographics ==
As of the census of 2000, there were 128 people, 58 households, and 37 families living in the township. The population density was 4.3 people per square mile (1.7/km^{2}). There were 211 housing units at an average density of 7.1/sq mi (2.8/km^{2}). The racial makeup of the township was 89.06% White, 1.56% African American, 2.34% Native American, and 7.03% from two or more races.

There were 58 households, out of which 19.0% had children under the age of 18 living with them, 62.1% were married couples living together, 1.7% had a female householder with no husband present, and 36.2% were non-families. 34.5% of all households were made up of individuals, and 17.2% had someone living alone who was 65 years of age or older. The average household size was 2.21 and the average family size was 2.86.

In the township the population was spread out, with 23.4% under the age of 18, 2.3% from 18 to 24, 14.8% from 25 to 44, 39.1% from 45 to 64, and 20.3% who were 65 years of age or older. The median age was 50 years. For every 100 females, there were 141.5 males. For every 100 females age 18 and over, there were 108.5 males.

The median income for a household in the township was $21,429, and the median income for a family was $29,583. Males had a median income of $27,917 versus $41,250 for females. The per capita income for the township was $11,320. There were 31.4% of families and 35.1% of the population living below the poverty line, including 45.1% of under eighteens and 30.4% of those over 64.
