= Harris Township, Itasca County, Minnesota =

Harris Township, Minnesota
- Township
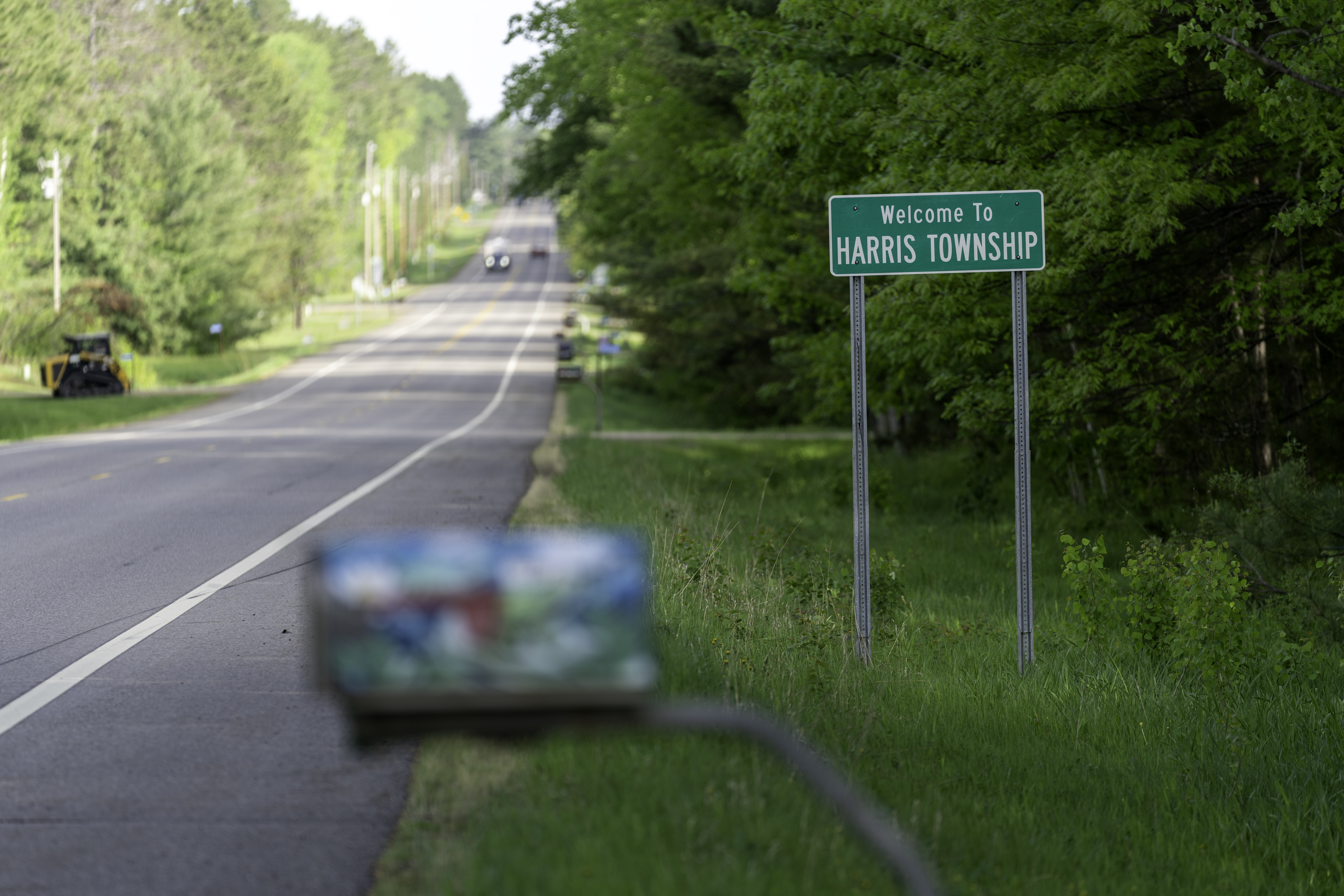
- Welcome to Harris Township sign along Great River Rd.

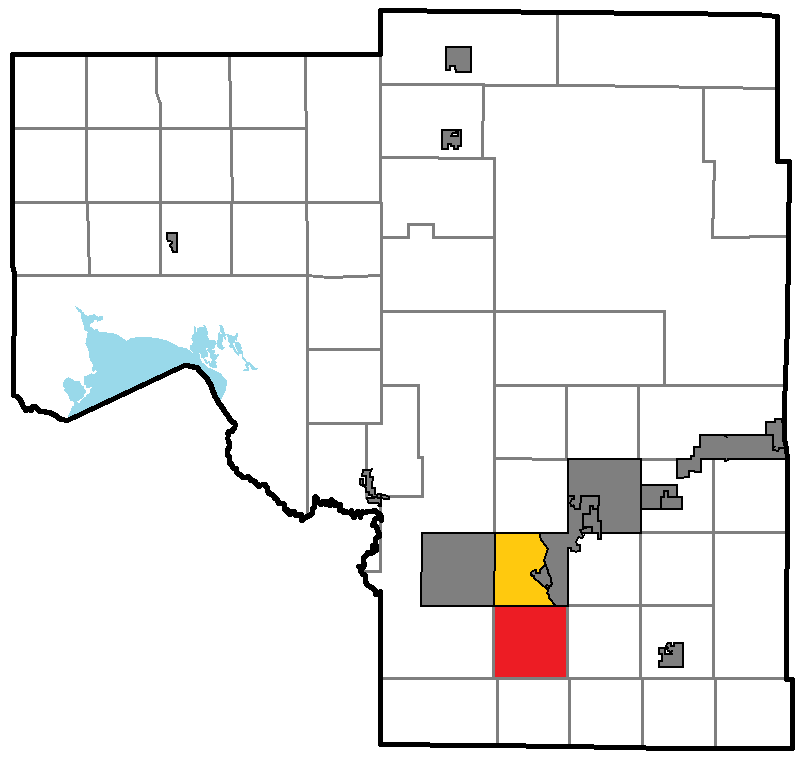
- Location of Harris Township, within Itasca County, Minnesota
- Coordinates: 47°9′41″N 93°31′24″W
- Country: United States
- State: Minnesota
- County: Itasca

Area
  - Total: 35.9 sq mi (92.9 km^{2})
  - Land: 31.9 sq mi (82.6 km^{2})
  - Water: 4.0 sq mi (10.3 km^{2})
- Elevation: 1,342 ft (409 m)

Population (2020)
  - Total: 3,276
  - Density: 103/sq mi (39.7/km^{2})
- Time zone: UTC-6 (Central (CST))
  - Summer (DST): UTC-5 (CDT)
- ZIP code: 55744
- Area code: 218
- FIPS code: 27-27296
- GNIS feature ID: 0664401
- Website: https://www.harristownshipmn.org/

Harris Township is a township in Itasca County, Minnesota, United States. The population was 3,276 at the 2020 census.

Harris Township was named for Duncan Harris, a pioneer farmer.

== Geography ==
According to the United States Census Bureau, the township has a total area of 35.9 square miles (93 km^{2}), of which 31.9 square miles (83 km^{2}) is land and 4.0 square miles (10 km^{2}), or 11.04%, is water.

== Demographics ==
At the 2000 census, there were 3,328 people, 1,290 households, and 992 families living in the township. The population density was 104.3 inhabitants per square mile (40.3/km^{2}). There were 1,516 housing units at an average density of 47.5 per square mile (18.3/km^{2}). The racial makeup of the township was 97.87% White, 0.21% African American, 0.69% Native American, 0.30% Asian, 0.06% from other races, and 0.87% from two or more races. Hispanic or Latino of any race were 0.21%.

Of the 1,290 households, 33.1% had children under the age of 18 living with them, 68.1% were married couples living together, 4.7% had a female householder with no husband present, and 23.1% were non-families. 19.3% of households were one person and 6.4% were one person aged 65 or older. The average household size was 2.58 and the average family size was 2.93.

The age distribution was 24.5% under the age of 18, 7.1% from 18 to 24, 25.0% from 25 to 44, 30.3% from 45 to 64, and 13.1% 65 or older. The median age was 41 years. For every 100 females, there were 105.9 males. For every 100 females age 18 and over, there were 106.4 males.

The median household income was $47,344 and the median family income was $54,508. Males had a median income of $38,523 versus $27,574 for females. The per capita income for the township was $20,757. About 5.2% of families and 6.5% of the population were below the poverty line, including 7.9% of those under age 18 and 7.4% of those age 65 or over.
