= Nashwauk Township, Itasca County, Minnesota =

Nashwauk Township, Minnesota
- Township
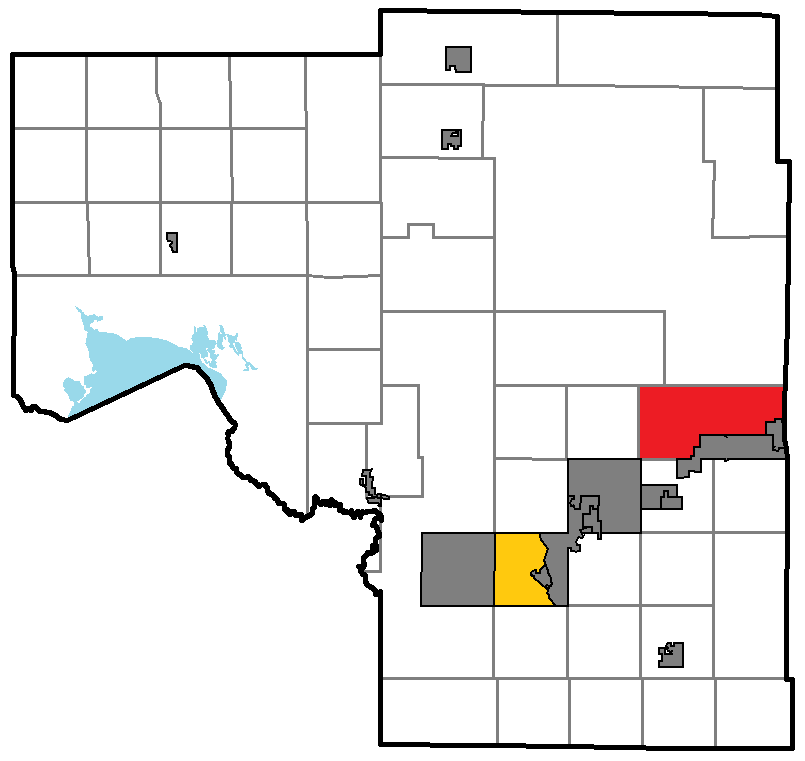
- Location of Nashwauk Township, within Itasca County, Minnesota
- Coordinates: 47°23′32″N 93°11′1″W
- Country: United States
- State: Minnesota
- County: Itasca

Area
  - Total: 68.4 sq mi (177.1 km^{2})
  - Land: 65.9 sq mi (170.7 km^{2})
  - Water: 2.4 sq mi (6.3 km^{2})
- Elevation: 1,493 ft (455 m)

Population (2020)
  - Total: 1,657
  - Density: 25.14/sq mi (9.707/km^{2})
- Time zone: UTC-6 (Central (CST))
  - Summer (DST): UTC-5 (CDT)
- ZIP code: 55769
- Area code: 218
- FIPS code: 27-44998
- GNIS feature ID: 0665071
- Website: https://nashwauktownshipmn.gov/

Nashwauk Township is a township in Itasca County, Minnesota, United States. The population was 1,657 at the 2020 census.

== Geography ==
According to the United States Census Bureau, the township has a total area of 68.4 square miles (177.1 km^{2}), of which 65.9 square miles (170.8 km^{2}) is land and 2.5 square miles (6.3 km^{2}), or 3.58%, is water.

== Demographics ==
As of the census of 2000, there were 1,666 people, 714 households, and 491 families residing in the township. The population density was 25.3 people per square mile (9.8/km^{2}). There were 814 housing units at an average density of 12.3/sq mi (4.8/km^{2}). The racial makeup of the township was 98.56% White, 0.36% Native American, 0.06% Asian, and 1.02% from two or more races. Hispanic or Latino of any race were 0.30% of the population.

There were 714 households, out of which 27.0% had children under the age of 18 living with them, 57.6% were married couples living together, 7.4% had a female householder with no husband present, and 31.2% were non-families. 28.3% of all households were made up of individuals, and 16.4% had someone living alone who was 65 years of age or older. The average household size was 2.33 and the average family size was 2.82.

In the township the population was spread out, with 22.3% under the age of 18, 7.6% from 18 to 24, 24.5% from 25 to 44, 26.1% from 45 to 64, and 19.6% who were 65 years of age or older. The median age was 42 years. For every 100 females, there were 98.8 males. For every 100 females age 18 and over, there were 96.8 males.

The median income for a household in the township was $31,151, and the median income for a family was $37,269. Males had a median income of $32,708 versus $21,838 for females. The per capita income for the township was $16,118. About 7.5% of families and 10.7% of the population were below the poverty line, including 15.8% of those under age 18 and 9.0% of those age 65 or over.
