= Oteneagen Township, Itasca County, Minnesota =

Oteneagen Township, Minnesota
- Township
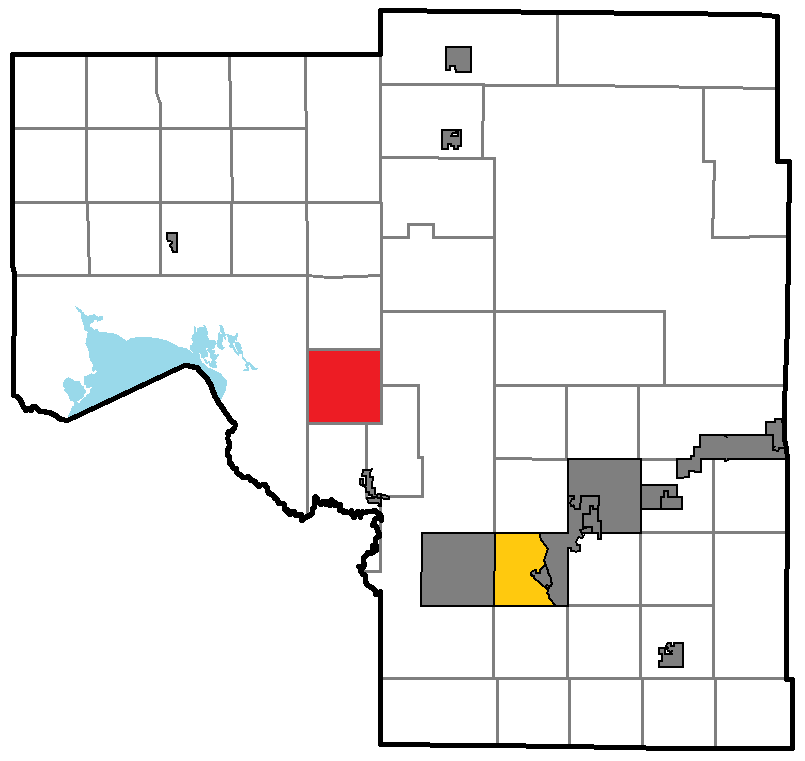
- Location of Oteneagen Township, within Itasca County, Minnesota
- Coordinates: 47°27′47″N 93°51′34″W
- Country: United States
- State: Minnesota
- County: Itasca

Area
  - Total: 36.3 sq mi (94.1 km^{2})
  - Land: 36.1 sq mi (93.5 km^{2})
  - Water: 0.19 sq mi (0.5 km^{2})
- Elevation: 1,352 ft (412 m)

Population (2020)
  - Total: 313
  - Density: 8.67/sq mi (3.35/km^{2})
- Time zone: UTC-6 (Central (CST))
  - Summer (DST): UTC-5 (CDT)
- ZIP code: 56636
- Area code: 218
- FIPS code: 27-49048
- GNIS feature ID: 0665234

Oteneagen Township is a township in Itasca County, Minnesota, United States. The population was 313 at the 2020 census.

The name is derived from the Ontonagon River in Michigan.

== Geography ==
According to the United States Census Bureau, the township has a total area of 36.3 square miles (94.1 km^{2}), of which 36.1 square miles (93.6 km^{2}) is land and 0.2 square mile (0.5 km^{2}), or 0.58%, is water.

== Demographics ==
As of the census of 2000, there were 246 people, 87 households, and 72 families living in the township. The population density was 6.8 people per square mile (2.6/km^{2}). There were 98 housing units at an average density of 2.7/sq mi (1.0/km^{2}). The racial makeup of the township was 82.11% White, 5.28% Native American, and 12.60% from two or more races. Hispanic or Latino of any race were 0.41% of the population.

There were 87 households, out of which 42.5% had children under the age of 18 living with them, 64.4% were married couples living together, 13.8% had a female householder with no husband present, and 16.1% were non-families. 14.9% of all households were made up of individuals, and 3.4% had someone living alone who was 65 years of age or older. The average household size was 2.83 and the average family size was 3.12.

In the township the population was spread out, with 33.3% under the age of 18, 7.7% from 18 to 24, 23.6% from 25 to 44, 30.5% from 45 to 64, and 4.9% who were 65 years of age or older. The median age was 35 years. For every 100 females, there were 98.4 males. For every 100 females age 18 and over, there were 105.0 males.

The median income for a household in the township was $30,313, and the median income for a family was $27,250. Males had a median income of $38,571 versus $14,000 for females. The per capita income for the township was $13,527. About 23.5% of families and 28.9% of the population were below the poverty line, including 28.6% of those under the age of eighteen and 18.2% of those 65 or over.
