= Arbo Township, Itasca County, Minnesota =

Arbo Township, Minnesota
- Township
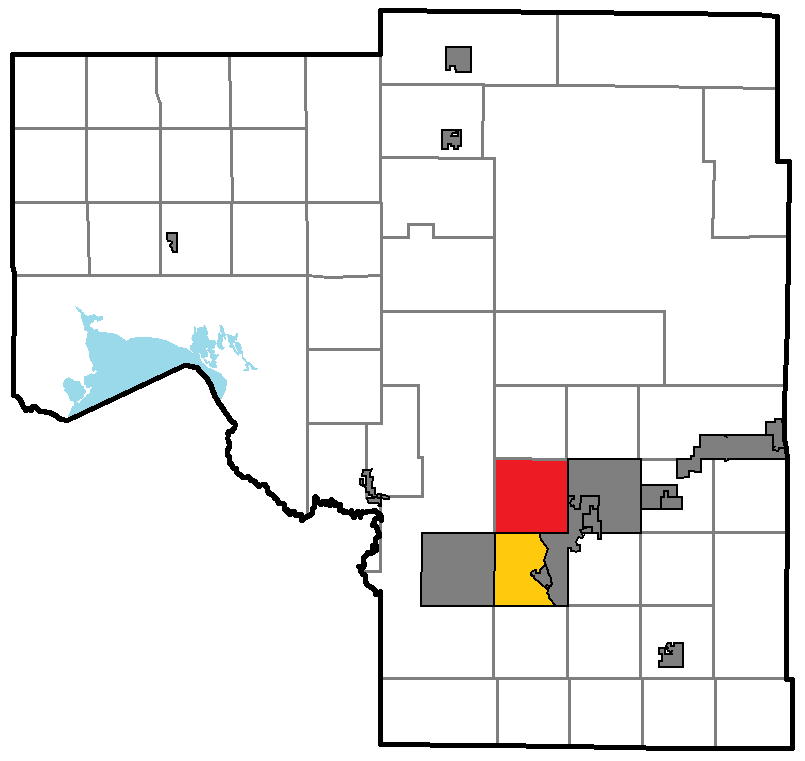
- Location of Arbo Township, within Itasca County, Minnesota
- Coordinates: 47°19′3″N 93°31′51″W
- Country: United States
- State: Minnesota
- County: Itasca

Area
  - Total: 36.8 sq mi (95.4 km^{2})
  - Land: 33.6 sq mi (87.0 km^{2})
  - Water: 3.2 sq mi (8.3 km^{2})
- Elevation: 1,299 ft (396 m)

Population (2020)
  - Total: 862
  - Density: 25.7/sq mi (9.91/km^{2})
- Time zone: UTC-6 (Central (CST))
  - Summer (DST): UTC-5 (CDT)
- FIPS code: 27-01936
- GNIS feature ID: 0663448

Arbo Township is a township in Itasca County, Minnesota, United States. The population was 862 at the 2020 census.

Arbo Township was named for John Arbo, an early settler.

== Geography ==
According to the United States Census Bureau, the township has a total area of 36.8 square miles (95 km^{2}), of which 33.6 square miles (87 km^{2}) is land and 3.2 square miles (8.3 km^{2}), or 8.72%, is water.

== Demographics ==
As of the census of 2000, there were 898 people, 349 households, and 272 families living in the township. The population density was 26.7 inhabitants per square mile (10.3/km^{2}). There were 449 housing units at an average density of 13.4 per square mile (5.2/km^{2}). The racial makeup of the township was 98.78% White, 0.11% Native American, 0.22% Asian, and 0.89% from two or more races. Hispanic or Latino of any race were 0.78% of the population.

There were 349 households, out of which 30.7% had children under the age of 18 living with them, 72.2% were married couples living together, 3.4% had a female householder with no husband present, and 21.8% were non-families. 17.8% of all households were made up of individuals, and 5.7% had someone living alone who was 65 years of age or older. The average household size was 2.57 and the average family size was 2.91.

In the township the population was spread out, with 23.2% under the age of 18, 6.2% from 18 to 24, 26.6% from 25 to 44, 31.6% from 45 to 64, and 12.4% who were 65 years of age or older. The median age was 42 years. For every 100 females, there were 103.2 males. For every 100 females age 18 and over, there were 102.9 males.

The median income for a household in the township was $42,371, and the median income for a family was $45,455. Males had a median income of $35,750 versus $23,438 for females. The per capita income for the township was $20,035. About 4.0% of families and 5.8% of the population were below the poverty line, including 8.9% of those under age 18 and 3.4% of those age 65 or over.
