= Wabana Township, Itasca County, Minnesota =

Wabana Township, Minnesota
- Township
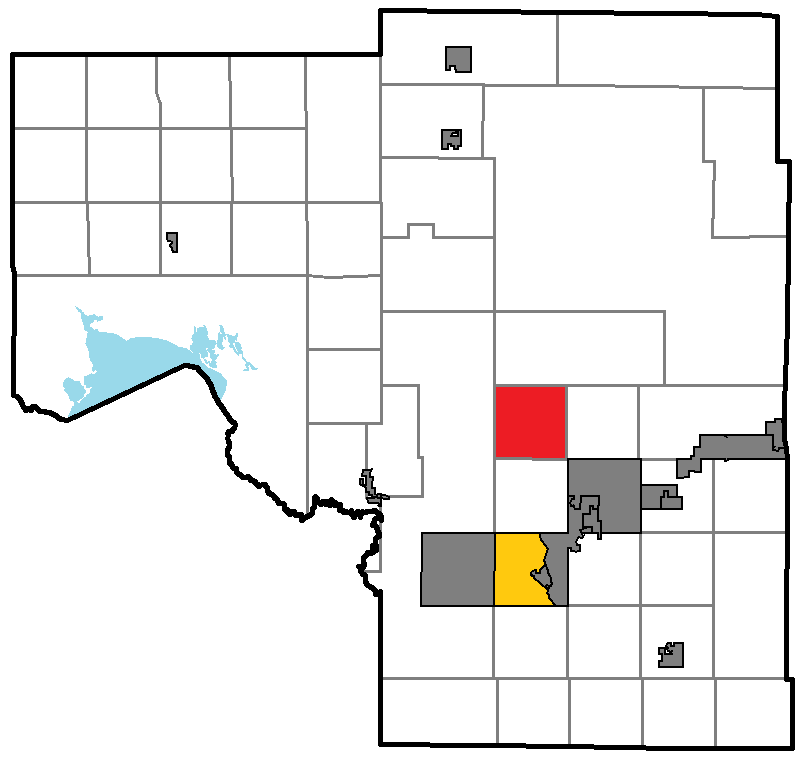
- Location of Wabana Township, within Itasca County, Minnesota
- Coordinates: 47°24′32″N 93°30′37″W
- Country: United States
- State: Minnesota
- County: Itasca

Government
  - Type: Township

Area
  - Total: 36.0 sq mi (93.2 km^{2})
  - Land: 29.1 sq mi (75.4 km^{2})
  - Water: 6.9 sq mi (17.8 km^{2})
- Elevation: 1,316 ft (401 m)

Population (2020)
  - Total: 503
  - Density: 17.3/sq mi (6.67/km^{2})
- Time zone: UTC-6 (Central (CST))
  - Summer (DST): UTC-5 (CDT)
- Postal code: 55744
- Area code: 218
- FIPS code: 27-67360
- GNIS feature ID: 0665882
- Website: https://wabanatownship.com/

Wabana Township is a township in Itasca County, Minnesota, United States. The population was 503 at the 2020 census.

== Geography ==
According to the United States Census Bureau, the township has a total area of 36.0 square miles (93.2 km^{2}), of which 29.1 square miles (75.4 km^{2}) is land and 6.9 square miles (17.8 km^{2}), or 19.14%, is water.

== Demographics ==
As of the census of 2000, there were 487 people, 186 households, and 149 families living in the township. The population density was 16.7 people per square mile (6.5/km^{2}). There were 331 housing units at an average density of 11.4/sq mi (4.4/km^{2}). The racial makeup of the township was 98.77% White, and 1.23% from two or more races. Hispanic or Latino of any race were 0.21% of the population.

There were 186 households, out of which 32.8% had children under the age of 18 living with them, 73.1% were married couples living together, 2.7% had a female householder with no husband present, and 19.4% were non-families. 16.7% of all households were made up of individuals, and 5.4% had someone living alone who was 65 years of age or older. The average household size was 2.62 and the average family size was 2.93.

In the township the population was spread out, with 24.2% under the age of 18, 5.1% from 18 to 24, 26.7% from 25 to 44, 29.6% from 45 to 64, and 14.4% who were 65 years of age or older. The median age was 42 years. For every 100 females, there were 106.4 males. For every 100 females age 18 and over, there were 108.5 males.

The median income for a household in the township was $51,563, and the median income for a family was $57,344. Males had a median income of $39,583 versus $26,875 for females. The per capita income for the township was $27,789. About 2.0% of families and 3.9% of the population were below the poverty line, including 8.3% of those under age 18 and none of those age 65 or over.
