= Dora Lake, Minnesota =

Unincorporated community in Minnesota, United States

Dora Lake
- Unincorporated community
- Location within Minnesota Location within the United States
- Coordinates: 47°44′19″N 94°02′25″W
- Country: United States
- State: Minnesota
- County: Itasca
- Township: Kinghurst Township
- Elevation: 1,325 ft (404 m)

Population
  - Total: 70
- Time zone: UTC-6 (Central (CST))
  - Summer (DST): UTC-5 (CDT)
- ZIP code: 56661
- Area code: 218
- GNIS feature ID: 656029

Dora Lake is an unincorporated community in Kinghurst Township, Itasca County, Minnesota, United States; located within the Chippewa National Forest. The community is located near Wirt at the junction of Itasca County Roads 29 and 145.

Nearby places include Northome, Wirt, Max, and Alvwood. Dora Lake is located 20 miles southeast of Northome; and 22 miles west of Bigfork. Dora Lake is 24 miles east of Blackduck; and 41 miles northwest of Deer River.

ZIP codes 56661 (Northome), 56688 (Wirt), and 56659 (Max) all meet near Dora Lake. A post office previously operated in the community of Dora Lake, first as Popple (1905–1946), and then as Dora Lake (1946–1953), until its closing in 1953.

The Bowstring River is nearby.
