= Liberty (unorganized territory), Minnesota =

Unorganized Territory in Minnesota, United States

Liberty Unorganized Territory, Minnesota
- Unorganized Territory
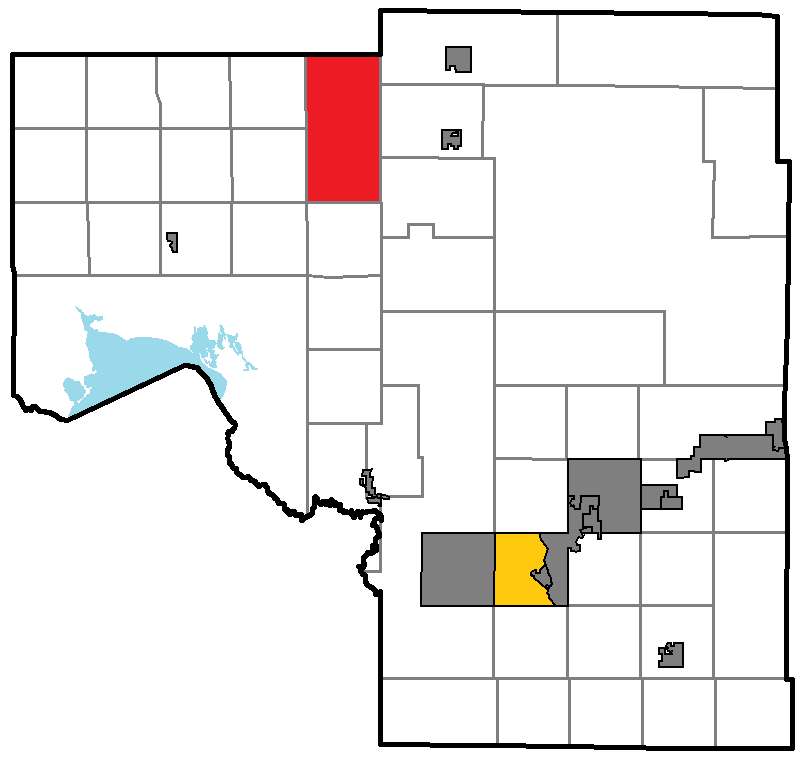
- Location of Liberty, within Itasca County, Minnesota
- Coordinates: 47°42′42″N 93°49′21″W
- Country: United States
- State: Minnesota
- County: Itasca

Area
  - Total: 72.4 sq mi (187.5 km^{2})
  - Land: 70.7 sq mi (183.1 km^{2})
  - Water: 1.7 sq mi (4.4 km^{2})
- Elevation: 1,325 ft (404 m)

Population (2020)
  - Total: 62
  - Density: 0.88/sq mi (0.34/km^{2})
- Time zone: UTC-6 (Central (CST))
  - Summer (DST): UTC-5 (CDT)
- FIPS code: 27-36944
- GNIS feature ID: 0664776

Liberty Township was a township in Itasca County, Minnesota, United States. The population was 62 at the 2020 census. In November 2014, the residents of Liberty Township voted to dissolve their township status. In October 2015, the process was finalized and what was once Liberty Township is now an unorganized territory of Itasca County.

== Geography ==
According to the United States Census Bureau, the township has a total area of 72.4 square miles (187.5 km^{2}), of which 70.7 square miles (183.1 km^{2}) is land and 1.7 square miles (4.4 km^{2}), or 2.35%, is water.

== Demographics ==
As of the census of 2000, there were 91 people, 39 households, and 29 families residing in the township. The population density was 1.3 inhabitants per square mile (0.50/km^{2}). There were 98 housing units at an average density of 1.4 per square mile (0.54/km^{2}). The racial makeup of the township was 98.90% White and 1.10% Asian. Hispanic or Latino of any race were 2.20% of the population.

There were 39 households, out of which 23.1% had children under the age of 18 living with them, 69.2% were married couples living together, and 25.6% were non-families. 23.1% of all households were made up of individuals, and 15.4% had someone living alone who was 65 years of age or older. The average household size was 2.33 and the average family size was 2.72.

In the township the population was spread out, with 23.1% under the age of 18, 2.2% from 18 to 24, 16.5% from 25 to 44, 31.9% from 45 to 64, and 26.4% who were 65 years of age or older. The median age was 50 years. For every 100 females, there were 122.0 males. For every 100 females age 18 and over, there were 105.9 males.

The median income for a household in the township was $25,938, and the median income for a family was $27,188. Males had a median income of $100,000 versus $18,750 for females. The per capita income for the township was $22,462. There were no families and 3.9% of the population living below the poverty line, including no under eighteens and 5.6% of those over 64.
