= Pomroy Township, Itasca County, Minnesota =

Pomroy Township, Minnesota
- Township
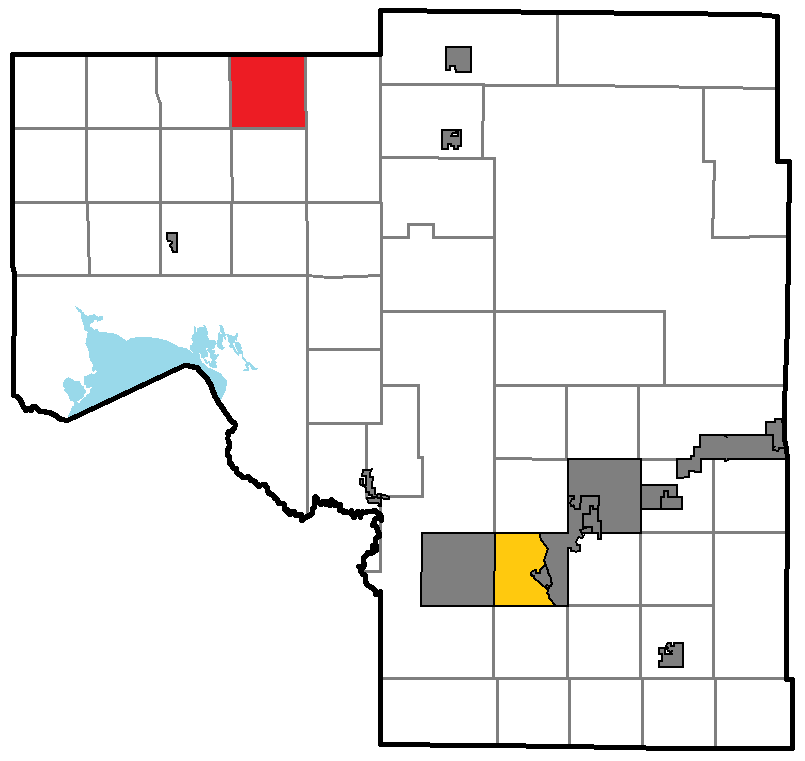
- Location of Pomroy Township, within Itasca County, Minnesota
- Coordinates: 47°45′47″N 93°59′5″W
- Country: United States
- State: Minnesota
- County: Itasca

Area
  - Total: 37.0 sq mi (95.9 km^{2})
  - Land: 36.8 sq mi (95.2 km^{2})
  - Water: 0.27 sq mi (0.7 km^{2})
- Elevation: 1,350 ft (410 m)

Population (2020)
  - Total: 33
  - Density: 0.90/sq mi (0.35/km^{2})
- Time zone: UTC-6 (Central (CST))
  - Summer (DST): UTC-5 (CDT)
- FIPS code: 27-51856
- GNIS feature ID: 0665334

Pomroy Township is a township in Itasca County, Minnesota, United States. The population was 33 at the 2020 census.

== Geography ==
According to the United States Census Bureau, the township has a total area of 37.0 square miles (95.9 km^{2}), of which 36.8 square miles (95.2 km^{2}) is land and 0.3 square miles (0.7 km^{2}), or 0.73%, is water.

== Demographics ==
At the 2000 census there were 33 people, 13 households, and 8 families in the township. The population density was 0.9 people per square mile (0.3/km^{2}). There were 46 housing units at an average density of 1.3/sq mi (0.5/km^{2}). The racial makeup of the township was 84.85% White, 3.03% African American, 3.03% Native American, and 9.09% from two or more races. Of the 13 households 38.5% had children under the age of 18 living with them, 46.2% were married couples living together, 7.7% had a female householder with no husband present, and 30.8% were non-families. 30.8% of households were one person and 15.4% were one person aged 65 or older. The average household size was 2.54 and the average family size was 3.22.

The age distribution was 30.3% under the age of 18, 6.1% from 18 to 24, 24.2% from 25 to 44, 24.2% from 45 to 64, and 15.2% 65 or older. The median age was 36 years. For every 100 females, there were 175.0 males. For every 100 females age 18 and over, there were 187.5 males.

The median household income was $32,500 and the median family income was $37,813. Males had a median income of $26,250 versus $0 for females. The per capita income for the township was $11,412. None of the population and none of the families were below the poverty line.
