= Itasca County, Minnesota =

County in Minnesota, United States

- County
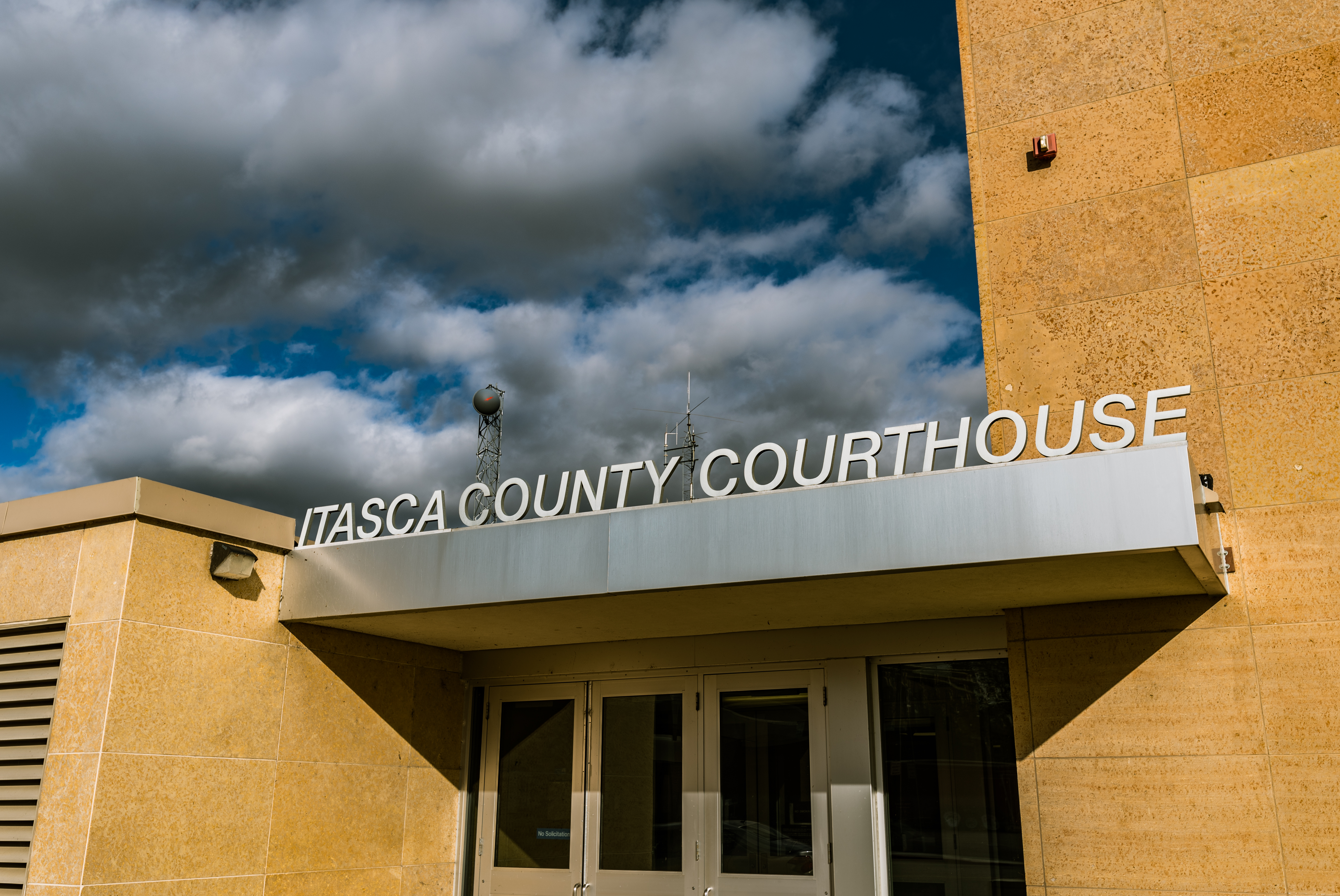
- Itasca County Courthouse

- Location within the U.S. state of Minnesota
- Coordinates: 47°31′N 93°38′W
- Country: United States
- State: Minnesota
- Founded: October 27, 1849
- Named for: Lake Itasca
- Seat: Grand Rapids
- Largest city: Grand Rapids

Area
  - Total: 2,928 sq mi (7,580 km^{2})
  - Land: 2,668 sq mi (6,910 km^{2})
  - Water: 260 sq mi (670 km^{2}) 8.9%

Population (2020)
  - Total: 45,014
  - Estimate (2025): 45,404 ▲
  - Density: 16.9/sq mi (6.5/km^{2})
- Time zone: UTC−6 (Central)
  - Summer (DST): UTC−5 (CDT)
- Congressional district: 8th
- Website: www.itascacountymn.gov

Itasca County (/aɪˈtæskə/ eye-TASS-kə) is a county in the Iron Range region of the U.S. state of Minnesota. As of the 2020 census, the population was 45,014. Its county seat is Grand Rapids. The county is named after Lake Itasca, whose name comes from the Latin veritas caput, meaning "truth" and "head", because it is the true source of the Mississippi River. Parts of the Bois Forte and Leech Lake Indian reservations are in the county.

== History ==
The boundaries of Itasca County were first defined in 1849, upon the creation of the Minnesota Territory. It was originally much larger, stretching over today's Cook, Lake, Saint Louis, Koochiching, eastern Lake of the Woods, eastern Beltrami, Itasca, northern Aitkin, and northern Carlton Counties.

Itasca County was originally named for Lake Itasca (no longer in the county's present borders), which was determined to be the true source of the Mississippi River. After many disputes over the Mississippi's source, Henry Schoolcraft set out to find it in 1832. When he did, he named it Lake Itasca. At its source, the Mississippi can be crossed on foot. It then flows past Bemidji, through Itasca County, to the Gulf of Mexico.

== Geography ==
The terrain of Itasca County is hilly, heavily wooded, and studded with lakes and ponds. It generally slopes to the east, with its highest areas on its upper western border, at 1,437 ft (438 m) ASL. The county has an area of 2,928 square miles (7,580 km^{2}), of which 2,668 square miles (6,910 km^{2}) is land and 260 square miles (670 km^{2}) (8.9%) is water. It is Minnesota's third-largest county by area.

Itasca County's landscape varies greatly. The low plains, rolling hills, and wetlands are where there was glacial activity in the past. This area has been forested for centuries. The forests include pines, spruces, hardwoods, cedar, and tamarack. Forestry and logging are major sectors in the area's economy.

Itasca County has many bodies of water, including creeks, rivers, and more than 1,400 lakes. The bodies of water support various wildlife species. Major bodies of water in the county include Lake Winnibigoshish, Pokegama Lake, Deer Lake, the Mississippi River, Bowstring Lake, and the Blandin Paper Mill Reservoir.

=== Major highways ===
- U.S. Highway 2
- U.S. Highway 71
- U.S. Highway 169
- Minnesota State Highway 1
- Minnesota State Highway 6
- Minnesota State Highway 38
- Minnesota State Highway 46
- Minnesota State Highway 65
- Minnesota State Highway 286

=== Adjacent counties ===
- Koochiching County - north
- Saint Louis County - east
- Aitkin County - south
- Cass County - southwest
- Beltrami County - west

=== Protected areas ===
- Big Fork State Forest
- Botany Bog Scientific and Natural Area
- Chippewa National Forest (part)
- George Washington State Forest (part)
- Golden Anniversary State Forest
- Marcell Experimental Forest
- Scenic State Park

== Demographics ==
Historical population
Census	Pop.	Note	%±
1850	97		—
1860	51		−47.4%
1870	96		88.2%
1880	124		29.2%
1890	743		499.2%
1900	4,573		515.5%
1910	17,208		276.3%
1920	23,876		38.7%
1930	27,224		14.0%
1940	32,996		21.2%
1950	33,321		1.0%
1960	38,006		14.1%
1970	35,530		−6.5%
1980	43,069		21.2%
1990	40,863		−5.1%
2000	43,992		7.7%
2010	45,058		2.4%
2020	45,014		−0.1%
2025 (est.)	45,404	▲	0.9%
U.S. Decennial Census; 1790-1960 1900-1990; 1990-2000 2010-2020

=== 2020 census ===
As of the 2020 census, the county had a population of 45,014. The median age was 46.5 years. 21.1% of residents were under the age of 18 and 24.6% of residents were 65 years of age or older. For every 100 females there were 102.4 males, and for every 100 females age 18 and over there were 101.0 males age 18 and over.

The racial makeup of the county was 89.7% White, 0.4% Black or African American, 3.4% American Indian and Alaska Native, 0.3% Asian, <0.1% Native Hawaiian and Pacific Islander, 0.5% from some other race, and 5.7% from two or more races. Hispanic or Latino residents of any race comprised 1.4% of the population.

23.0% of residents lived in urban areas, while 77.0% lived in rural areas.

There were 18,968 households in the county, of which 24.4% had children under the age of 18 living in them. Of all households, 50.9% were married-couple households, 19.4% were households with a male householder and no spouse or partner present, and 21.9% were households with a female householder and no spouse or partner present. About 29.8% of all households were made up of individuals and 14.5% had someone living alone who was 65 years of age or older.

There were 25,375 housing units, of which 25.2% were vacant. Among occupied housing units, 79.9% were owner-occupied and 20.1% were renter-occupied. The homeowner vacancy rate was 1.7% and the rental vacancy rate was 8.3%.

=== Racial and ethnic composition ===
Itasca County, Minnesota – Racial and ethnic composition Note: the US Census treats Hispanic/Latino as an ethnic category. This table excludes Latinos from the racial categories and assigns them to a separate category. Hispanics/Latinos may be of any race.
Race / Ethnicity (NH = Non-Hispanic)	Pop 1980	Pop 1990	Pop 2000	Pop 2010	Pop 2020	% 1980	% 1990	% 2000	% 2010	% 2020
White alone (NH)	41,677	39,263	41,494	41,951	40,166	96.77%	96.08%	94.32%	93.10%	89.23%
Black or African American alone (NH)	29	39	69	136	174	0.07%	0.10%	0.16%	0.30%	0.39%
Native American or Alaska Native alone (NH)	1,087	1,334	1,448	1,541	1,497	2.52%	3.26%	3.29%	3.42%	3.33%
Asian alone (NH)	92	83	120	142	145	0.21%	0.20%	0.27%	0.32%	0.32%
Native Hawaiian or Pacific Islander alone (NH)	x	x	10	12	2	x	x	0.02%	0.03%	0.00%
Other race alone (NH)	36	1	22	11	125	0.08%	0.00%	0.05%	0.02%	0.28%
Mixed race or Multiracial (NH)	x	x	566	848	2,287	x	x	1.29%	1.88%	5.08%
Hispanic or Latino (any race)	148	143	263	417	618	0.34%	0.35%	0.60%	0.93%	1.37%
Total	43,069	40,863	43,992	45,058	45,014	100.00%	100.00%	100.00%	100.00%	100.00%

=== 2000 census ===
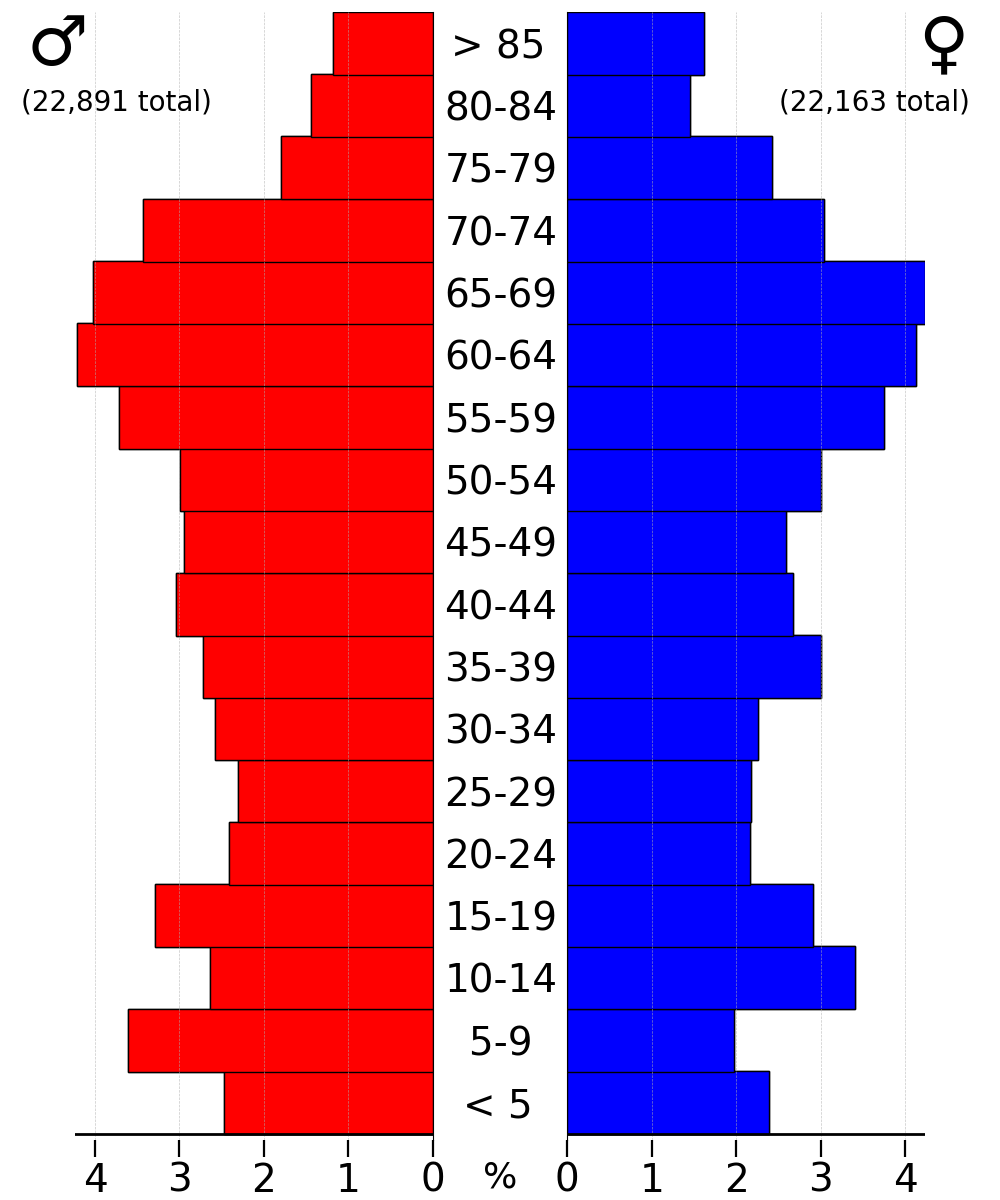
2022 US Census population pyramid for Itasca County, from ACS 5-year estimates

As of the census of 2000, there were 43,992 people, 17,789 households, and 12,381 families in the county. The population density was 16.5 per square mile (6.4/km^{2}). There were 24,528 housing units at an average density of 9.19 per square mile (3.55/km^{2}). The racial makeup of the county was 94.64% White, 0.16% Black or African American, 3.40% Native American, 0.27% Asian, 0.02% Pacific Islander, 0.16% from other races, and 1.34% from two or more races. 0.60% of the population were Hispanic or Latino of any race. 25.6% were of German, 13.8% Norwegian, 7.7% Finnish, 7.2% Swedish, 6.2% Irish, 5.0% United States or American and 5.0% English ancestry.

There were 17,789 households, out of which 29.20% had children under the age of 18 living with them, 58.30% were married couples living together, 7.60% had a female householder with no husband present, and 30.40% were non-families. 26.00% of all households were made up of individuals, and 12.20% had someone living alone who was 65 years of age or older. The average household size was 2.43 and the average family size was 2.91.

The county population contained 24.40% under the age of 18, 7.60% from 18 to 24, 24.40% from 25 to 44, 26.70% from 45 to 64, and 16.80% who were 65 years of age or older. The median age was 41 years. For every 100 females there were 99.70 males. For every 100 females age 18 and over, there were 98.20 males age 18 and over.

The median income for a household in the county was $36,234, and the median income for a family was $44,025. Males had a median income of $37,066 versus $22,327 for females. The per capita income for the county was $17,717. About 7.70% of families and 10.60% of the population were below the poverty line, including 13.60% of those under age 18 and 8.80% of those age 65 or over.

== Communities ==
=== Cities ===
- Bigfork
- Bovey
- Calumet
- Cohasset
- Coleraine
- Deer River
- Effie
- Grand Rapids (county seat)
- Keewatin
- La Prairie
- Marble
- Nashwauk
- Squaw Lake
- Taconite
- Warba
- Zemple

=== Census-designated places ===
- Ball Club
- Goodland
- Inger

=== Unincorporated communities ===
- Alvwood
- Bass Lake
- Bear River
- Bergville
- Blackberry
- Bowstring
- Dora Lake
- Dunbar
- Goodland
- Grattan
- Gunn
- Houpt
- Jessie Lake
- Mack
- Marcell
- Martin
- Max
- Orth
- Pengilly
- Pomroy
- Rosy
- Spring Lake
- Suomi
- Swan River
- Talmoon
- Togo
- Wawina
- Wirt

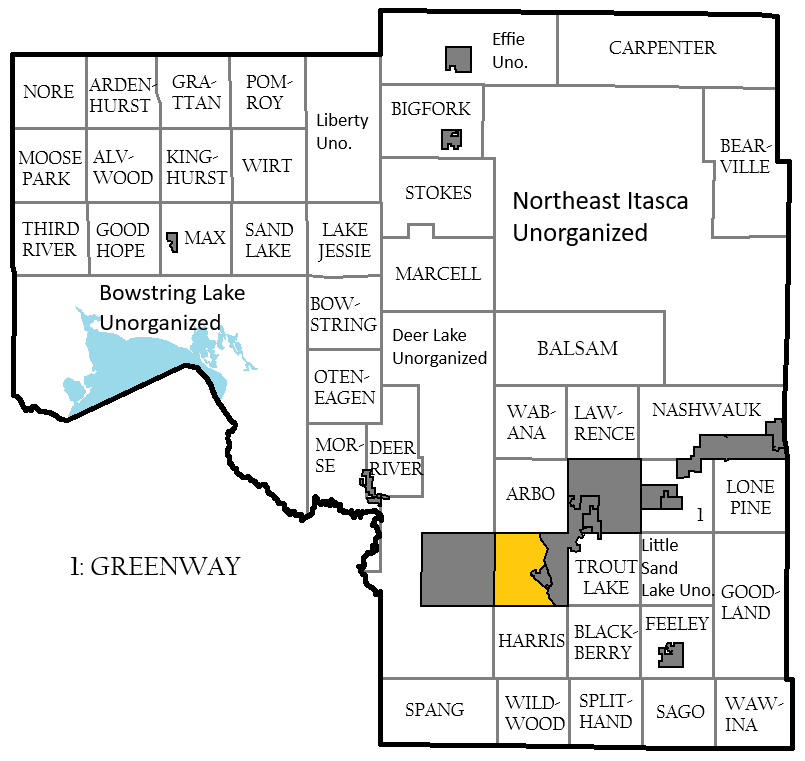
Townships and Unorganized Territories of Itasca County

=== Townships ===
- Alvwood Township
- Arbo Township
- Ardenhurst Township
- Balsam Township
- Bearville Township
- Bigfork Township
- Blackberry Township
- Bowstring Township
- Carpenter Township
- Deer River Township
- Feeley Township
- Good Hope Township
- Goodland Township
- Grand Rapids Township
- Grattan Township
- Greenway Township
- Harris Township
- Iron Range Township
- Kinghurst Township
- Lake Jessie Township
- Lawrence Township
- Lone Pine Township
- Marcell Township
- Max Township
- Moose Park Township
- Morse Township
- Nashwauk Township
- Nore Township
- Oteneagen Township
- Pomroy Township
- Sago Township
- Sand Lake Township
- Spang Township
- Splithand Township
- Stokes Township
- Third River Township
- Trout Lake Township
- Wabana Township
- Wawina Township
- Wildwood Township
- Wirt Township

=== Unorganized territories ===
- Bowstring Lake
- Deer Lake
- Effie
- Liberty
- Little Sand Lake
- Northeast Itasca

== Politics ==
Like fellow Iron Range counties St. Louis County, Carlton County, and Lake County, Itasca County voted strongly Democratic in presidential elections for about 80 years after the Great Depression, selecting the Democratic nominee in every election from 1932 through 2012. In 2016, the county swung Republican as Donald Trump received 54.1% of the vote. In 2020, Trump won 57.4% of the vote, the first time the county had voted Republican in two consecutive presidential elections since 1924 and 1928. In 2024, Trump won 59% of the vote, the most for a Republican presidential nominee since 1924.

United States presidential election results for Itasca County, Minnesota
Year	Republican		Democratic		Third party(ies)	
Year	No.	%	No.	%	No.	%
1892	520	40.66%	686	53.64%	73	5.71%
1896	826	52.91%	724	46.38%	11	0.70%
1900	770	63.32%	413	33.96%	33	2.71%
1904	1,796	77.02%	293	12.56%	243	10.42%
1908	1,883	63.15%	684	22.94%	415	13.92%
1912	446	16.59%	699	25.99%	1,544	57.42%
1916	1,163	36.89%	1,504	47.70%	486	15.41%
1920	3,973	58.31%	1,930	28.33%	910	13.36%
1924	4,961	60.10%	496	6.01%	2,798	33.89%
1928	5,103	58.95%	3,122	36.07%	431	4.98%
1932	3,782	36.94%	5,616	54.86%	839	8.20%
1936	3,594	28.04%	8,896	69.40%	329	2.57%
1940	5,196	34.06%	9,899	64.89%	159	1.04%
1944	4,227	32.28%	8,787	67.10%	81	0.62%
1948	4,334	29.45%	9,653	65.60%	729	4.95%
1952	6,573	41.65%	9,128	57.84%	81	0.51%
1956	6,408	42.22%	8,737	57.56%	33	0.22%
1960	6,615	38.00%	10,761	61.82%	32	0.18%
1964	4,137	25.49%	12,054	74.27%	40	0.25%
1968	4,898	30.22%	10,512	64.86%	796	4.91%
1972	7,558	45.58%	8,683	52.36%	342	2.06%
1976	6,646	32.77%	12,979	64.00%	656	3.23%
1980	8,368	37.65%	12,134	54.59%	1,726	7.76%
1984	9,306	44.42%	11,455	54.68%	187	0.89%
1988	8,358	43.87%	10,517	55.20%	178	0.93%
1992	5,952	28.56%	9,621	46.17%	5,265	25.27%
1996	6,506	31.78%	10,706	52.29%	3,261	15.93%
2000	9,545	43.96%	10,583	48.74%	1,586	7.30%
2004	10,705	43.93%	13,290	54.54%	372	1.53%
2008	10,309	42.26%	13,460	55.18%	626	2.57%
2012	10,501	43.90%	12,852	53.73%	566	2.37%
2016	12,920	54.10%	9,015	37.75%	1,945	8.14%
2020	15,239	57.37%	10,786	40.61%	536	2.02%
2024	15,863	59.10%	10,467	39.00%	510	1.90%

== See also ==
- National Register of Historic Places listings in Itasca County, Minnesota
