= La Prairie, Minnesota =

City in Minnesota, United States

La Prairie
- Town
- Location of the town of La Prairie within Itasca County, Minnesota
- Coordinates: 47°13′36″N 93°29′37″W
- Country: United States
- State: Minnesota
- County: Itasca

Area
  - Total: 1.70 sq mi (4.41 km^{2})
  - Land: 1.65 sq mi (4.28 km^{2})
  - Water: 0.050 sq mi (0.13 km^{2})
- Elevation: 1,283 ft (391 m)

Population (2020)
  - Total: 653
  - Density: 395.3/sq mi (152.61/km^{2})
- Time zone: UTC-6 (Central (CST))
  - Summer (DST): UTC-5 (CDT)
- ZIP code: 55744
- Area code: 218
- FIPS code: 27-35648
- GNIS feature ID: 0656924
- Website: https://www.cityoflaprairiemn.gov/

La Prairie is a town in Itasca County, Minnesota, United States. The population was 653 at the 2020 census.

U.S. Highways 2 and 169 are two of the main routes in La Prairie.

== History ==
A post office was in operation at La Prairie from 1890 until 1917. The community was named after the nearby Prairie River.

== Geography ==
According to the United States Census Bureau, the town has a total area of 1.69 square miles (4.38 km^{2}), of which 1.64 square miles (4.25 km^{2}) is land and 0.05 square miles (0.13 km^{2}) is water.

La Prairie is adjacent to the town of Grand Rapids.

== Demographics ==
Historical population
Census	Pop.	Note	%±
1900	88		—
1910	48		−45.5%
1920	63		31.3%
1930	43		−31.7%
1940	69		60.5%
1950	88		27.5%
1960	243		176.1%
1970	413		70.0%
1980	536		29.8%
1990	438		−18.3%
2000	605		38.1%
2010	665		9.9%
2020	653		−1.8%
U.S. Decennial Census

=== 2010 census ===
As of the census of 2010, there were 665 people, 270 households, and 184 families living in the town. The population density was 405.5 inhabitants per square mile (156.6/km^{2}). There were 287 housing units at an average density of 175.0 per square mile (67.6/km^{2}). The racial makeup of the town was 91.6% White, 0.6% African American, 2.9% Native American, 0.2% from other races, and 4.8% from two or more races. Hispanic or Latino of any race were 0.9% of the population.

There were 270 households, of which 30.4% had children under the age of 18 living with them, 54.1% were married couples living together, 10.7% had a female householder with no husband present, 3.3% had a male householder with no wife present, and 31.9% were non-families. 27.4% of all households were made up of individuals, and 12.6% had someone living alone who was 65 years of age or older. The average household size was 2.39 and the average family size was 2.86.

The median age in the town was 41.8 years. 24.5% of residents were under the age of 18; 7.2% were between the ages of 18 and 24; 21.5% were from 25 to 44; 28.2% were from 45 to 64; and 18.8% were 65 years of age or older. The gender makeup of the town was 49.3% male and 50.7% female.

=== 2000 census ===
As of the census of 2000, there were 605 people, 239 households, and 174 families living in the town. The population density was 532.0 inhabitants per square mile (205.4/km^{2}). There were 249 housing units at an average density of 218.9 per square mile (84.5/km^{2}). The racial makeup of the town was 98.35% White, 1.32% Native American, and 0.33% from two or more races.

There were 239 households, out of which 32.6% had children under the age of 18 living with them, 60.3% were married couples living together, 9.2% had a female householder with no husband present, and 26.8% were non-families. 20.1% of all households were made up of individuals, and 4.6% had someone living alone who was 65 years of age or older. The average household size was 2.50 and the average family size was 2.90.

In the town, the population was spread out, with 25.1% under the age of 18, 7.8% from 18 to 24, 26.3% from 25 to 44, 27.9% from 45 to 64, and 12.9% who were 65 years of age or older. The median age was 40 years. For every 100 females, there were 106.5 males. For every 100 females age 18 and over, there were 103.1 males.

The median income for a household in the town was $39,375, and the median income for a family was $50,250. Males had a median income of $41,125 versus $23,681 for females. The per capita income for the town was $18,632. About 7.7% of families and 10.0% of the population were below the poverty line, including 9.8% of those under age 18 and 15.3% of those age 65 or over.
