= Minnesota State Highway 46 =

State highway in Minnesota, United States

Trunk Highway 46
- MN 46 highlighted in red

Route information
- Maintained by MnDOT
- Length: 46.377 mi (74.637 km)
- Existed: 1933–present

Major junctions
- South end: US 2 in Morse Township, near Deer River
- North end: MN 1 in Northome

Location
- Country: United States
- State: Minnesota
- Counties: Itasca, Koochiching

Highway system
- Minnesota Trunk Highway System; Interstate; US; State; Legislative; Scenic
← MN 45	→ MN 47

Minnesota State Highway 46 (MN 46) is a 46.377-mile-long (74.637 km) highway in north-central Minnesota, which runs from its intersection with U.S. Highway 2 near Deer River (northwest of Grand Rapids) and continues northwest to its northern terminus at its intersection with State Highway 1 in Northome.

== Route description ==
Highway 46 serves as a northwest–southeast route between the communities of Deer River, Squaw Lake, and Northome.

The roadway passes through the Chippewa National Forest in Itasca County.

The northern terminus for Highway 46 is its intersection with State Highway 1 in Northome, 5 blocks from U.S. Highway 71.

The route is legally defined as Legislative Route 165 in the Minnesota Statutes. It is not marked with this number.

== History ==
Highway 46 was authorized in 1933.

By 1953, there was one remaining gravel section in the middle of this route. It was completely paved by 1958.

== Major intersections ==
County	Location	mi	km	Destinations	Notes
Itasca	Morse Township	0.000	0.000	US 2 – Deer River, Grand Rapids, Bemidji	
Itasca	Bowstring Lake	10.194	16.406	CSAH 37 / Great River Road (National Route) south	South end of Great River Road overlap
Itasca	Bowstring Lake	11.459	18.441	CSAH 9 (Winnie Dam Road) / Great River Road (National Route) north	North end of Great River Road overlap
Koochiching	Northome	46.380	74.641	MN 1 to US 71 – Red Lake, Effie	
1.000 mi = 1.609 km; 1.000 km = 0.621 mi
