= Bowstring Lake, Minnesota =

Unorganized territory in Itasca County, Minnesota, United States

- Unorganized territory
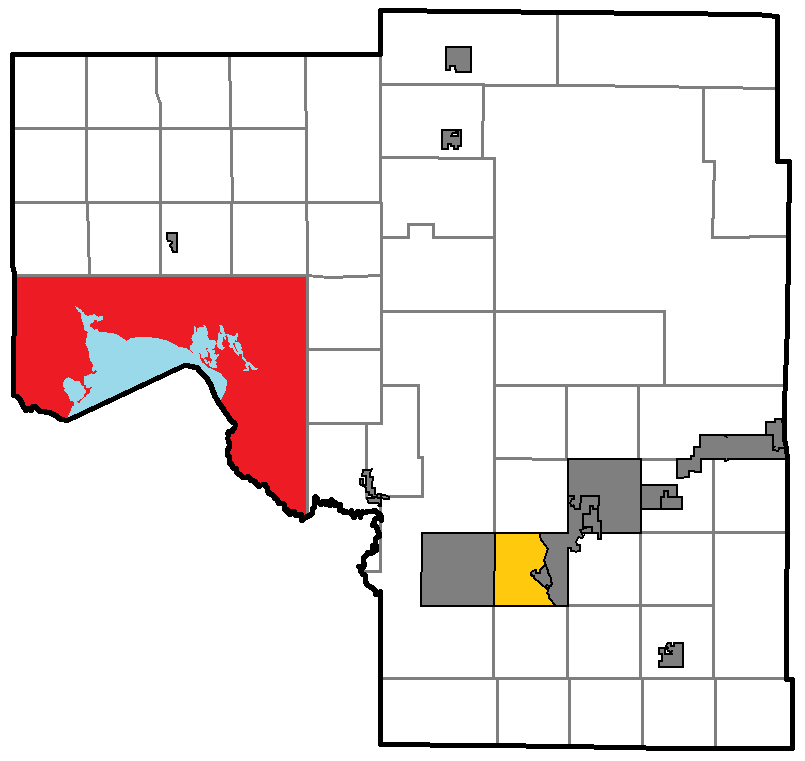
- Location of Bowstring Lake, within Itasca County, Minnesota
- Coordinates: 47°30′01″N 94°07′15″W
- Country: United States
- State: Minnesota
- County: Itasca

Area
  - Total: 284.1 sq mi (736 km^{2})
  - Land: 215.4 sq mi (558 km^{2})
  - Water: 68.8 sq mi (178 km^{2})

Population (2020)
  - Total: 1,178
  - Density: 5.469/sq mi (2.112/km^{2})
- Time zone: UTC–6 (CST)
  - Summer (DST): UTC–5 (CDT)
- ZIP Code: 56636
- Area code: 218

Bowstring Lake is an unorganized territory in Itasca County, Minnesota, United States. The population was 1,178 at the 2020 census.

== Geography ==
According to the United States Census Bureau, the unorganized territory has a total area of 284.1 square miles (735.9 km^{2}), of which 215.4 square miles (557.8 km^{2}) is land and 68.8 square miles (178.2 km^{2}), or 24.21%, is water.

Roughly half the land area is part of the Leech Lake Indian Reservation.

== Demographics ==
At the 2000 census there were 1,203 people, 378 households, and 286 families living in the unorganized territory. The population density was 5.6 inhabitants per square mile (2.2/km^{2}). There were 635 housing units at an average density of 2.9 per square mile (1.1/km^{2}). The racial makeup of the unorganized territory was 36.66% White, 0.17% Black or African American, 61.35% Native American, 0.17% Asian, 0.25% Pacific Islander, 0.08% from other races, and 1.33% from two or more races. Hispanic or Latino of any race were 2.16%.

Of the 378 households 42.1% had children under the age of 18 living with them, 48.9% were married couples living together, 19.0% had a female householder with no husband present, and 24.3% were non-families. 19.3% of households were one person and 7.9% were one person aged 65 or older. The average household size was 3.18 and the average family size was 3.63.

The age distribution was 37.2% under the age of 18, 8.9% from 18 to 24, 24.0% from 25 to 44, 19.3% from 45 to 64, and 10.6% 65 or older. The median age was 30 years. For every 100 females, there were 106.7 males. For every 100 females age 18 and over, there were 104.1 males.

The median household income was $24,191 and the median family income was $27,019. Males had a median income of $24,904 versus $27,708 for females. The per capita income for the unorganized territory was $10,248. About 20.1% of families and 21.2% of the population were below the poverty line, including 26.0% of those under age 18 and 17.6% of those age 65 or over.
