= Balsam Township, Itasca County, Minnesota =

Balsam Township, Minnesota
- Township
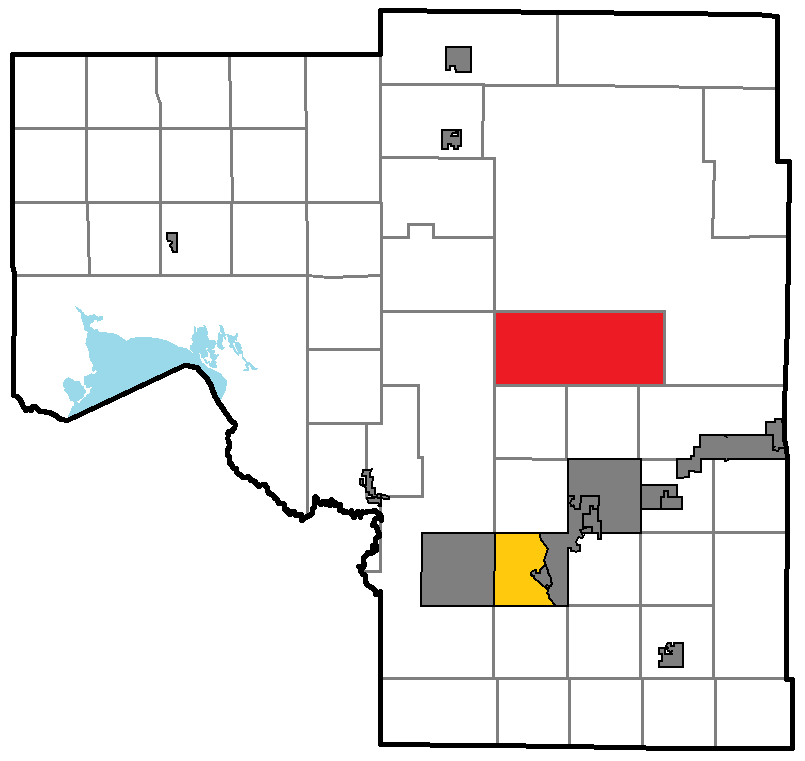
- Location of Balsam Township, within Itasca County, Minnesota
- Coordinates: 47°30′28″N 93°25′31″W
- Country: United States
- State: Minnesota
- County: Itasca

Area
  - Total: 83.3 sq mi (215.8 km^{2})
  - Land: 72.6 sq mi (188.1 km^{2})
  - Water: 10.7 sq mi (27.7 km^{2})
- Elevation: 1,355 ft (413 m)

Population (2020)
  - Total: 550
  - Density: 7.6/sq mi (2.9/km^{2})
- Time zone: UTC-6 (Central (CST))
  - Summer (DST): UTC-5 (CDT)
- FIPS code: 27-03430
- GNIS feature ID: 0663500

Balsam Township is a township in Itasca County, Minnesota, United States. The population was 550 at the 2020 census.

== Geography ==
According to the United States Census Bureau, the township has a total area of 83.3 square miles (216 km^{2}), of which 72.6 square miles (188 km^{2}) is land and 10.7 square miles (28 km^{2}), or 12.83%, is water.

== Demographics ==
At the 2000 census there were 553 people, 227 households, and 175 families living in the township. The population density was 7.6 people per square mile (2.9/km^{2}). There were 650 housing units at an average density of 8.9/sq mi (3.5/km^{2}). The racial makeup of the township was 96.93% White, 0.54% African American, 1.63% Native American, and 0.90% from two or more races. Hispanic or Latino of any race were 1.08%.

Of the 227 households 23.8% had children under the age of 18 living with them, 72.2% were married couples living together, 2.2% had a female householder with no husband present, and 22.5% were non-families. 20.3% of households were one person and 5.3% were one person aged 65 or older. The average household size was 2.44 and the average family size was 2.76.

The age distribution was 21.2% under the age of 18, 4.5% from 18 to 24, 22.6% from 25 to 44, 35.8% from 45 to 64, and 15.9% 65 or older. The median age was 46 years. For every 100 females, there were 106.3 males. For every 100 females age 18 and over, there were 107.6 males.

The median household income was $42,813 and the median family income was $48,125. Males had a median income of $45,357 versus $19,063 for females. The per capita income for the township was $21,488. About 3.1% of families and 3.9% of the population were below the poverty line, including none of those under age 18 and 3.6% of those age 65 or over.
