= Spring Lake, Itasca County, Minnesota =

Unincorporated community in Minnesota, United States

Spring Lake
- Unincorporated community
- Location within Minnesota Location within the United States
- Coordinates: 47°38′33″N 93°52′05″W
- Country: United States
- State: Minnesota
- County: Itasca
- Township: Lake Jessie Township
- Elevation: 1,352 ft (412 m)

Population
  - Total: 50
- Time zone: UTC-6 (Central (CST))
  - Summer (DST): UTC-5 (CDT)
- ZIP code: 56680
- Area code: 218
- GNIS feature ID: 658416

Spring Lake is an unincorporated community in Lake Jessie Township, Itasca County, Minnesota, United States; located within the Chippewa National Forest.

The community is located six miles west of Talmoon; at the junction of Itasca County Roads 4 and 29.

Nearby places include Bowstring, Talmoon, and Marcell. Spring Lake is located 26 miles north of Deer River; and 12 miles east of Squaw Lake. Spring Lake is 10 miles southeast of Wirt.

Spring Lake has a post office with ZIP code 56680.
