= Max, Minnesota =

Unincorporated community in Minnesota, United States

Max Okikaandagoonsing (Ojibwe)
- Unincorporated community
- Location within Minnesota Location within the United States
- Coordinates: 47°36′53″N 94°04′05″W
- Country: United States
- State: Minnesota
- County: Itasca
- Township: Max Township
- Elevation: 1,371 ft (418 m)
- Time zone: UTC-6 (Central (CST))
  - Summer (DST): UTC-5 (CDT)
- ZIP code: 56659
- Area code: 218
- GNIS feature ID: 657341

Max (Ojibwe: Okikaandagoonsing) is an unincorporated community in Max Township, Itasca County, Minnesota, United States; located within the Chippewa National Forest and the Leech Lake Indian Reservation.

The community is located southeast of Squaw Lake at the junction of Itasca County Roads 4 and 34. State Highway 46 (MN 46) is nearby.

Nearby places include Squaw Lake, Spring Lake, Inger, and Alvwood.

Max is located 3.5 miles southeast of Squaw Lake. Max is also located 25 miles northwest of Deer River.

== Media ==
=== Television ===
Channel	Callsign	Affiliation	Branding	Subchannels		Owner
(Virtual)	Callsign	Affiliation	Branding	Channel	Programming	Owner
13.1	K36KZ-D (WIRT Translator)	ABC	WDIO 13	13.2; 13.3	MeTV; Ion Television	EZ-TV, Inc.
21.1	K33OG-D (KQDS Translator)	FOX	FOX 21	21.2	Antenna TV	EZ-TV, Inc.
