= Wirt, Minnesota =

Unincorporated community in Minnesota, United States

Wirt
- Unincorporated community
- Location within Minnesota Location within the United States
- Coordinates: 47°43′50″N 93°57′36″W
- Country: United States
- State: Minnesota
- County: Itasca
- Township: Wirt Township
- Elevation: 1,332 ft (406 m)

Population
  - Total: 40
- Time zone: UTC-6 (Central (CST))
  - Summer (DST): UTC-5 (CDT)
- ZIP code: 56688
- Area code: 218
- GNIS feature ID: 659046

Wirt is an unincorporated community in Wirt Township, Itasca County, Minnesota, United States; located within the Chippewa National Forest.

The community is located 16 miles northwest of Talmoon at the junction of Itasca County Roads 29 and 31. County Road 14 is also nearby.

Nearby places include Dora Lake, Max, Spring Lake, and Alvwood. Wirt is located 17 miles west of Bigfork; and 25 miles southeast of Northome. Wirt is 16 miles east of Alvwood; and 36 miles north of Deer River.

The community of Wirt is located within Wirt Township (population 106). The Big Fork River flows through the community.

Wirt has a post office with ZIP code 56688.
