= Talmoon, Minnesota =

Unincorporated community in Minnesota, United States

Talmoon
- Unincorporated community
- Location within Minnesota Location within the United States
- Coordinates: 47°36′00″N 93°46′26″W
- Country: United States
- State: Minnesota
- County: Itasca
- Elevation: 1,371 ft (418 m)

Population
  - Total: 50
- Time zone: UTC-6 (Central (CST))
  - Summer (DST): UTC-5 (CDT)
- ZIP code: 56637
- Area code: 218
- GNIS feature ID: 659768

Talmoon is an unincorporated community in Itasca County, Minnesota, United States.

The community is located between Deer River and Big Falls at the junction of State Highways 6 (MN 6) and 286 (MN 286); and Itasca County Road 4 (CR 4).

Talmoon is located along the boundary line between Lake Jessie Township and Marcell Township. Little Turtle Lake is in the vicinity.

The community is located within the Chippewa National Forest; and is home to the "oldest bar" in Minnesota, located at Hayslip's Corner.

Talmoon is located 19 miles north of Deer River. Nearby places include Bowstring, Marcell, Spring Lake, Bigfork, and Effie.

== History ==
A post office operated in the community, first as Mack (1912–1938), then as Hayslips Corner (1938–1939), and then as Talmoon until its closing in 1954.

== Community ==
Local businesses include the Minnesota Energy Conservation Council, Crystal Rayne Publishing, Integrated Solutions/Advanced Technologies.
