= Bowstring River =

Coordinates: 47.7291181°N 94.0516050°W

Location
- Country: United States

Physical characteristics
- Source
  - location: Minnesota

The Bowstring River is a river of Minnesota, USA.

== See also ==
- List of rivers of Minnesota
