= Lake Jessie Township, Itasca County, Minnesota =

Lake Jessie Township, Minnesota
- Township
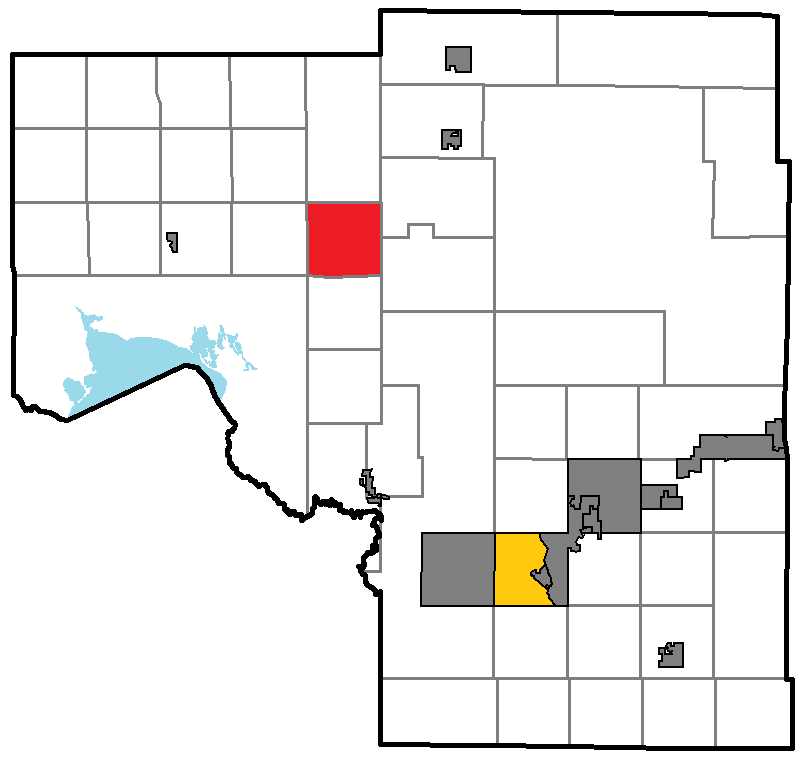
- Location of Lake Jessie Township, within Itasca County, Minnesota
- Coordinates: 47°38′13″N 93°48′35″W
- Country: United States
- State: Minnesota
- County: Itasca

Area
  - Total: 36.7 sq mi (95.0 km^{2})
  - Land: 33.4 sq mi (86.5 km^{2})
  - Water: 3.3 sq mi (8.5 km^{2})
- Elevation: 1,417 ft (432 m)

Population (2020)
  - Total: 248
  - Density: 7.43/sq mi (2.87/km^{2})
- Time zone: UTC-6 (Central (CST))
  - Summer (DST): UTC-5 (CDT)
- FIPS code: 27-34568
- GNIS feature ID: 0664683

Lake Jessie Township is a township in Itasca County, Minnesota, United States. The population was 248 at the 2020 census.

== Geography ==
According to the United States Census Bureau, the township has a total area of 36.7 square miles (95 km^{2}), of which 33.4 square miles (87 km^{2}) is land and 3.3 square miles (8.5 km^{2}), or 8.89%, is water.

== Demographics ==
As of the census of 2000, there were 335 people, 136 households, and 96 families living in the township. The population density was 10.0 inhabitants per square mile (3.9/km^{2}). There were 284 housing units at an average density of 8.5 per square mile (3.3/km^{2}). The racial makeup of the township was 99.40% White and 0.60% African American. Hispanic or Latino of any race were 0.30% of the population.

There were 136 households, out of which 25.0% had children under the age of 18 living with them, 63.2% were married couples living together, 2.9% had a female householder with no husband present, and 29.4% were non-families. 27.2% of all households were made up of individuals, and 10.3% had someone living alone who was 65 years of age or older. The average household size was 2.46 and the average family size was 2.95.

In the township the population was spread out, with 23.9% under the age of 18, 4.8% from 18 to 24, 22.7% from 25 to 44, 29.0% from 45 to 64, and 19.7% who were 65 years of age or older. The median age was 42 years. For every 100 females, there were 129.5 males. For every 100 females age 18 and over, there were 110.7 males.

The median income for a household in the township was $33,438, and the median income for a family was $38,125. Males had a median income of $27,813 versus $22,813 for females. The per capita income for the township was $18,865. About 11.7% of families and 17.9% of the population were below the poverty line, including 36.8% of those under age 18 and 14.9% of those age 65 or over.
