= Minnesota State Highway 286 =

State highway in Minnesota, United States

Trunk Highway 286
- MN 286 highlighted in red

Route information
- Maintained by MnDOT
- Length: 4.302 mi (6.923 km)
- Existed: July 1, 1949–present

Major junctions
- West end: MN 6 / CR 4 at Talmoon
- East end: MN 38 at Marcell

Location
- Country: United States
- State: Minnesota
- Counties: Itasca

Highway system
- Minnesota Trunk Highway System; Interstate; US; State; Legislative; Scenic
← MN 284	→ MN 287

Minnesota State Highway 286 (MN 286) is a 4.302-mile-long (6.923 km) highway in north-central Minnesota, which runs from its intersection with State Highway 6 in Talmoon and continues east to its eastern terminus at its intersection with State Highway 38 in Marcell.

== Route description ==
Highway 286 serves as a short east–west connector route in north-central Minnesota between the unincorporated communities of Talmoon and Marcell. The route connects State Highways 6 and 38. It is located within the Chippewa National Forest.

The roadway passes around the south side of Little Turtle Lake at Talmoon.

The route is legally defined as Route 286 in the Minnesota Statutes.

== History ==
Highway 286 was authorized on July 1, 1949.

The route was paved at the time it was marked.

== Major intersections ==
The entire route is in Itasca County.

Location	mi	km	Destinations	Notes
Talmoon	0.000	0.000	MN 6 / CSAH 4 west – Deer River, Big Falls	
Marcell	4.327	6.964	MN 38 – Grand Rapids, Bigfork, Effie	
1.000 mi = 1.609 km; 1.000 km = 0.621 mi
