= Suomi, Minnesota =

Unincorporated community in Minnesota, United States

Suomi
- Unincorporated community
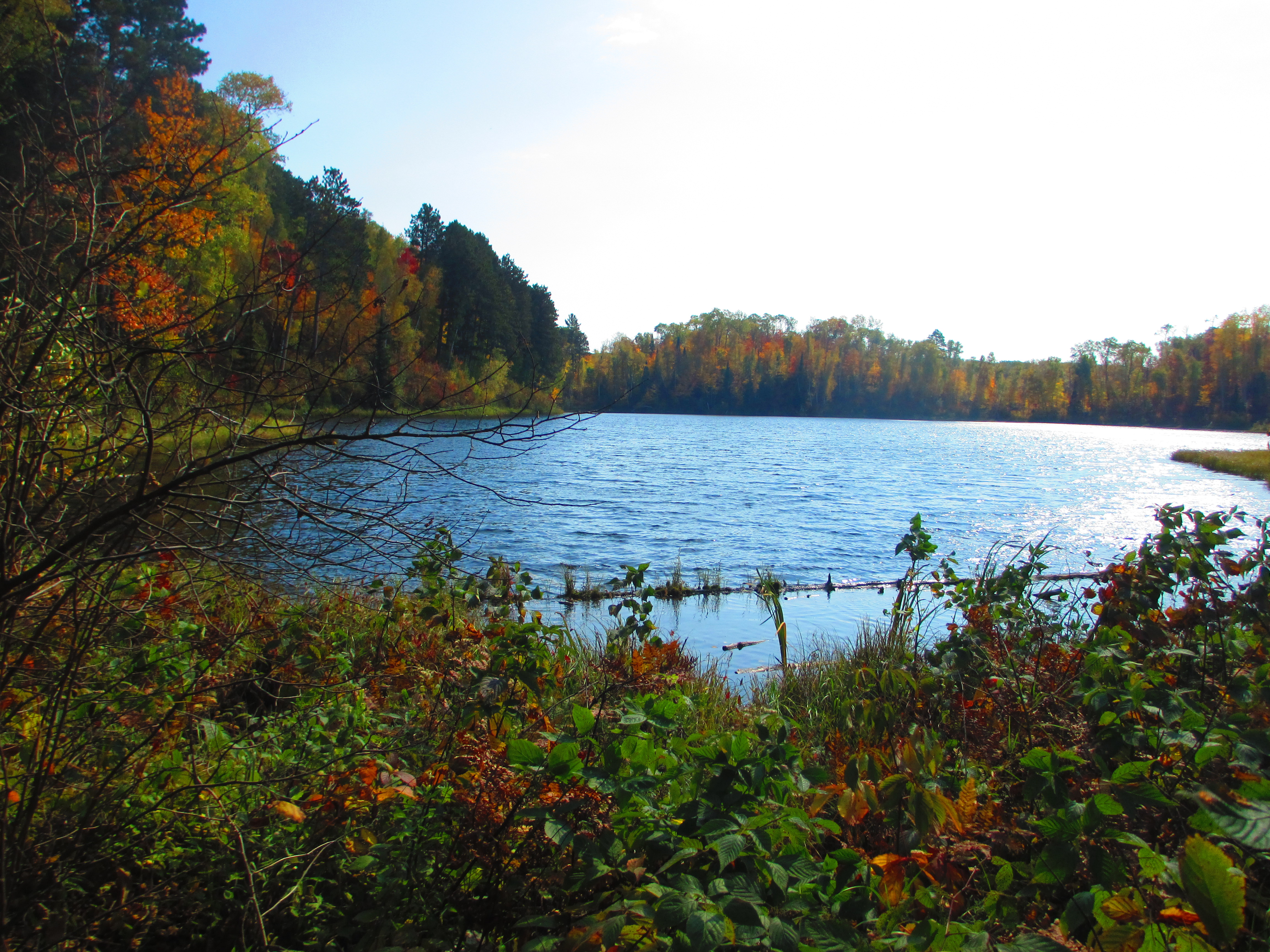
- Suomi Hills Recreation Area

- Location within Minnesota Location within the United States
- Coordinates: 47°29′00″N 93°44′29″W
- Country: United States
- State: Minnesota
- County: Itasca
- Elevation: 1,358 ft (414 m)

Population
  - Total: 10
- Time zone: UTC-6 (Central (CST))
  - Summer (DST): UTC-5 (CDT)
- ZIP code: 56636
- Area code: 218
- GNIS feature ID: 658549

Suomi is an unincorporated community in Itasca County, Minnesota, United States.

The community is located northeast of Deer River; along Itasca County Road 48 (CR 48). Nearby places include Marcell, Deer River, and Cohasset. State Highways 6 (MN 6) and 38 (MN 38); and County Road 19 are also nearby.

The center of Suomi is generally considered at the junction of Itasca County Roads 48 and 253. Little Bowstring Lake and the Bowstring River are in the vicinity. Suomi is located 13 miles northeast of Deer River; and 27 miles northwest of Grand Rapids. Suomi is 12 miles south of Marcell.

Suomi is located within ZIP code 56636 based in Deer River. A post office previously operated in the community of Suomi from 1921 to 1935.

The community is located within the Bowstring State Forest and the Chippewa National Forest. Suomi Hills Recreation Area on State Highway 38 is also nearby.

Suomi is a Finnish word that refers to Finland or the Finnish language.
