= Deer Lake, Minnesota =

Unorganized territory in Itasca County, Minnesota, United States

- Unorganized territory
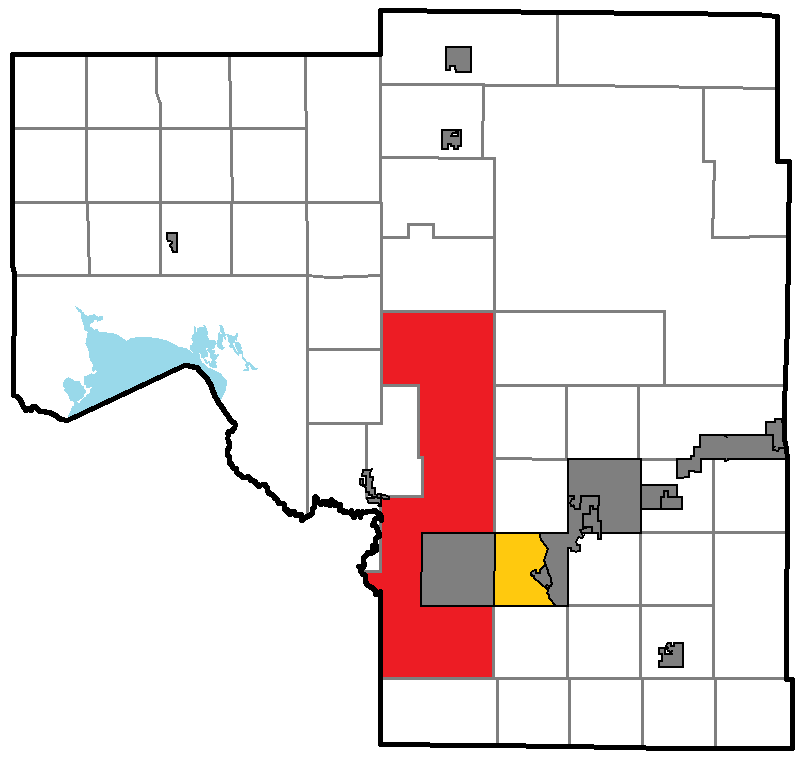
- Location of Deer Lake, within Itasca County, Minnesota
- Coordinates: 47°20′06″N 93°40′18″W
- Country: United States
- State: Minnesota
- County: Itasca

Area
  - Total: 216.0 sq mi (559 km^{2})
  - Land: 182.7 sq mi (473 km^{2})
  - Water: 33.3 sq mi (86 km^{2})

Population (2020)
  - Total: 3,664
  - Density: 20.05/sq mi (7.743/km^{2})
- Time zone: UTC–6 (CST)
  - Summer (DST): UTC–5 (CDT)
- ZIP Code: 55721, 55744, 56636
- Area code: 218

Deer Lake is an unorganized territory in Itasca County, Minnesota, United States. The population was 3,664 at the 2020 census.

== Geography ==
According to the United States Census Bureau, the unorganized territory has a total area of 216.0 square miles (559.4 km^{2}), of which 182.7 square miles (473.2 km^{2}) is land and 33.3 square miles (86.2 km^{2}), or 15.41%, is water. U.S. Highway 2, and State Highways 6 (MN 6) and 38 (MN 38) are in the surrounding area.

The unincorporated community of Suomi is located within Deer Lake Unorganized Territory.

Deer Lake also refers to a lake in the area. Nearby towns include Deer River, Cohasset, and Grand Rapids.

== Demographics ==
At the 2000 census there were 3,286 people, 1,304 households, and 993 families living in the unorganized territory. The population density was 18.0 inhabitants per square mile (6.9/km^{2}). There were 2,154 housing units at an average density of 11.8 per square mile (4.6/km^{2}). The racial makeup of the unorganized territory was 98.05% White, 0.91% Native American, 0.27% Asian, 0.03% Pacific Islander, 0.12% from other races, and 0.61% from two or more races. Hispanic or Latino of any race were 0.49%.

Of the 1,304 households 28.9% had children under the age of 18 living with them, 69.2% were married couples living together, 3.6% had a female householder with no husband present, and 23.8% were non-families. 20.3% of households were one person and 7.7% were one person aged 65 or older. The average household size was 2.51 and the average family size was 2.87.

The age distribution was 23.3% under the age of 18, 6.9% from 18 to 24, 23.9% from 25 to 44, 32.1% from 45 to 64, and 13.8% 65 or older. The median age was 43 years. For every 100 females, there were 105.8 males. For every 100 females age 18 and over, there were 108.1 males.

The median household income was $47,115 and the median family income was $53,520. Males had a median income of $38,393 versus $26,298 for females. The per capita income for the unorganized territory was $19,556. About 4.3% of families and 8.5% of the population were below the poverty line, including 9.1% of those under age 18 and 16.1% of those age 65 or over.

== In popular culture ==
- Deer Lake is the setting for novels by author Tami Hoag.

== Notable person ==
- Sam Brown, organizer of Moratorium to End the War in Vietnam, former Colorado State Treasurer
