= Zemple, Minnesota =

City in Minnesota, United States

Zemple
- City
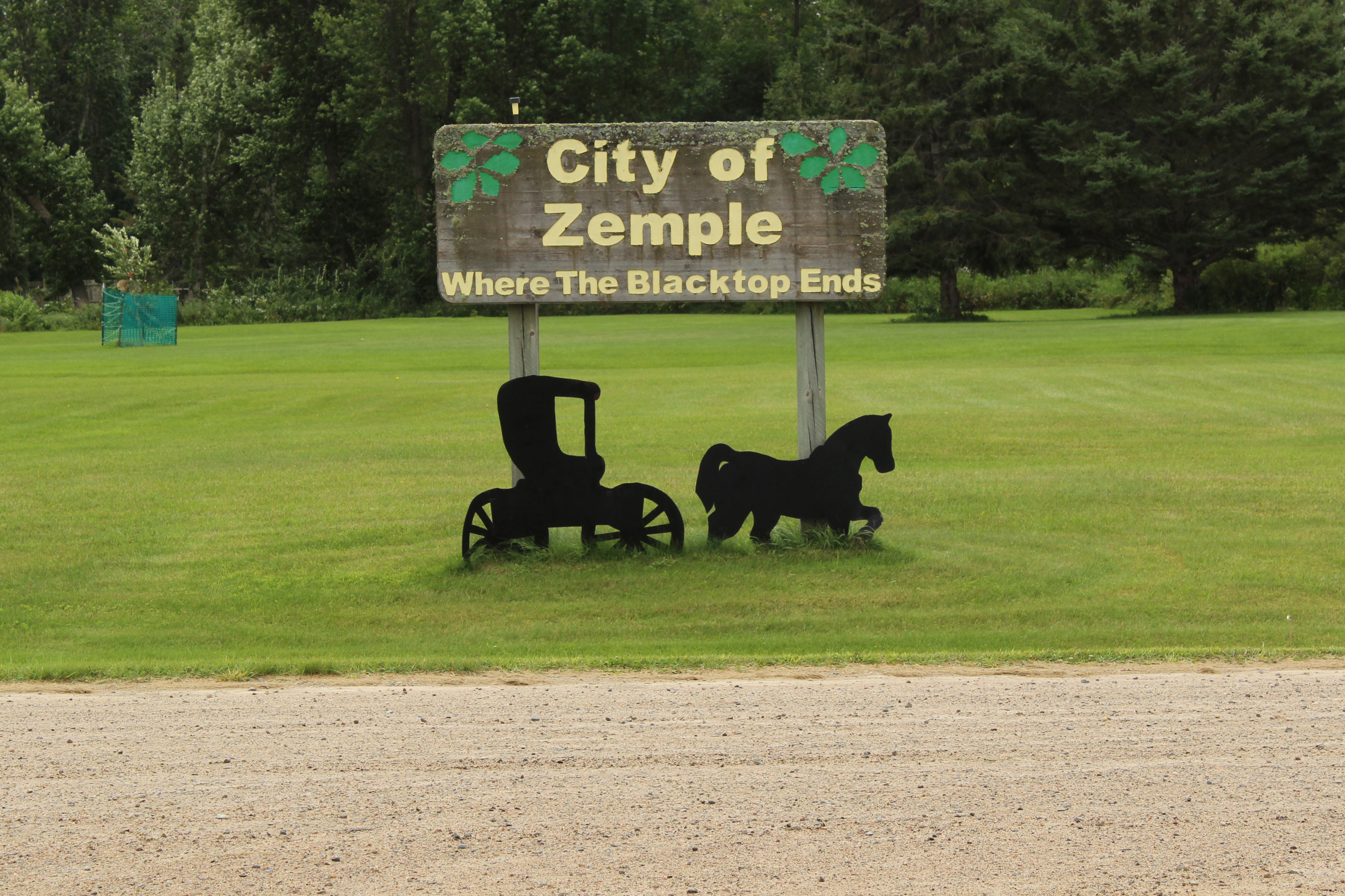
- Welcome sign
- Motto: "Where the Blacktop Ends"
- Location of the city of Zemple within Itasca County, Minnesota
- Coordinates: 47°19′13″N 93°47′44″W
- Country: United States
- State: Minnesota
- County: Itasca

Area
  - Total: 0.65 sq mi (1.69 km^{2})
  - Land: 0.65 sq mi (1.69 km^{2})
  - Water: 0 sq mi (0.00 km^{2})
- Elevation: 1,293 ft (394 m)

Population (2020)
  - Total: 78
  - Density: 119.9/sq mi (46.29/km^{2})
- Time zone: UTC-6 (Central (CST))
  - Summer (DST): UTC-5 (CDT)
- ZIP code: 56636
- Area code: 218
- FIPS code: 27-72184
- GNIS feature ID: 0659083

Zemple is a city in Itasca County, Minnesota, United States. The population was 78 at the 2020 census.

== Geography ==
According to the United States Census Bureau, the city has a total area of 0.80 square miles (2.07 km^{2}), all land.

U.S. Highway 2 and Minnesota State Highway 6 are in proximity to Zemple. The city of Deer River is adjacent to Zemple.

== History ==
Zemple was officially organized in 1911, with the first village council meeting held in June.

Early Zemple was a place where the former Minneapolis and Rainy River Railway had a roundhouse with 12 engines. Zemple had a store, a school (which closed in 1928), and a church.

The town was named for R. T. Zempel, who owned most of the land and was elected the first village president. The Zempels had a farm on the south end of the village. Other early residents included Martindales, Mayos, Simons, Nordahls, Dahls, Spragues, Johtonens, Nellis, Robertson, Blum, Reed, Folsom, Newkirks, Wrights and Berghs.

Lumber was the main industry in Zemple. There was a big sawmill on White Oak Point (a part of the Mississippi River), where logs where floated down to the sawmill. There was a planing mill, a veneer mill and a box mill, all of which burned down in later years. Excerpted from the Deer River Centennial History

The sawmill, referenced above. evolved under several different company names—Pillsbury-Watkins Company-1903, Joyce-Pillsbury Co.-1904, Deer River Lumber Co.-1906, eventually becoming Itasca Lumber Co. to its close in late 1921. ---from the book, Timber Connections—The Joyce Lumber Story—Bluewaters Press

== Demographics ==
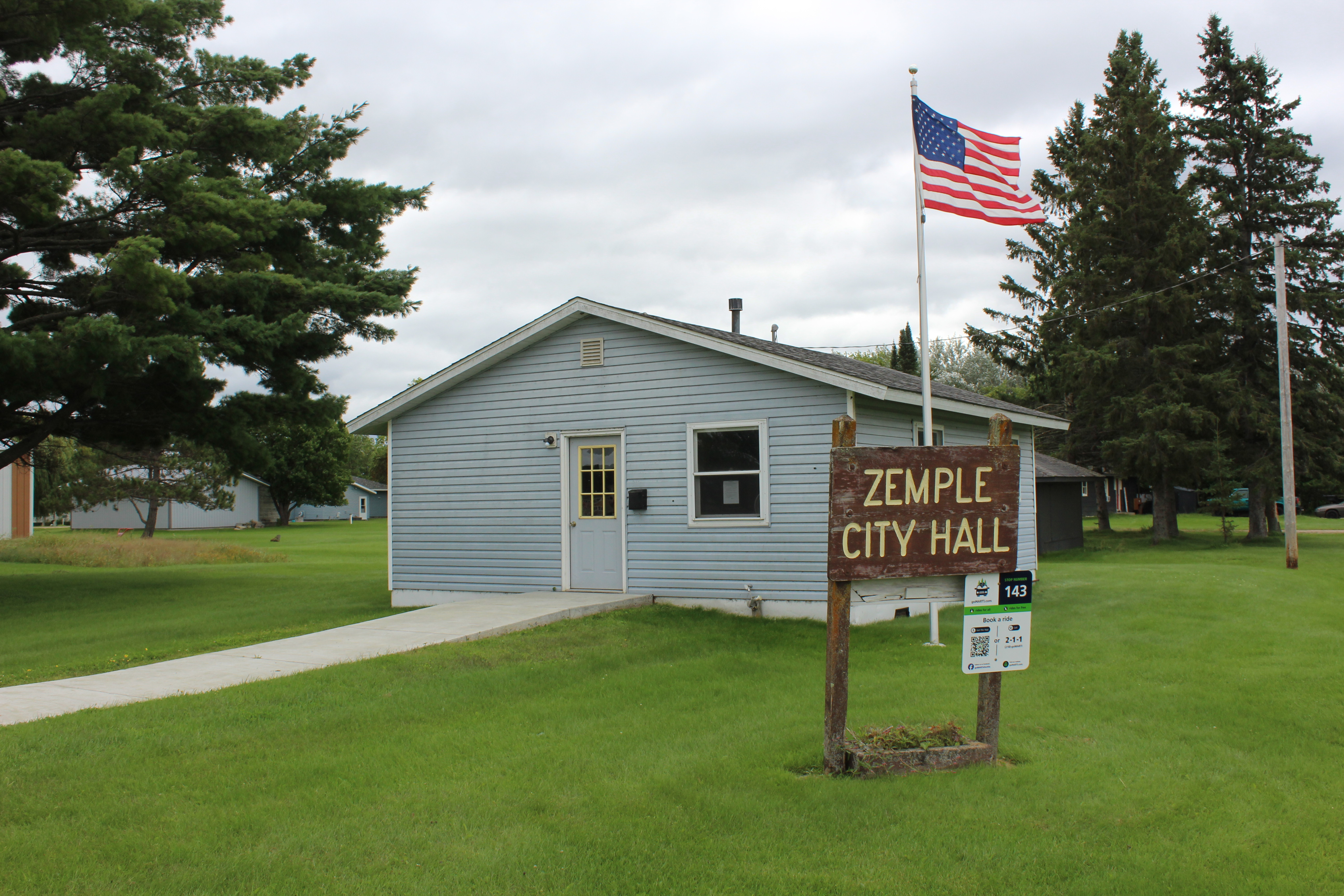
City hall

Historical population
Census	Pop.	Note	%±
1920	284		—
1930	164		−42.3%
1940	165		0.6%
1950	87		−47.3%
1960	82		−5.7%
1970	71		−13.4%
1980	62		−12.7%
1990	63		1.6%
2000	75		19.0%
2010	93		24.0%
2020	78		−16.1%
U.S. Decennial Census

=== 2010 census ===
As of the census of 2010, there were 93 people, 29 households, and 22 families living in the city. The population density was 116.3 inhabitants per square mile (44.9/km^{2}). There were 30 housing units at an average density of 37.5 per square mile (14.5/km^{2}). The racial makeup of the city was 93.5% White, 5.4% Native American, and 1.1% from two or more races.

There were 29 households, of which 48.3% had children under the age of 18 living with them, 58.6% were married couples living together, 13.8% had a female householder with no husband present, 3.4% had a male householder with no wife present, and 24.1% were non-families. 17.2% of all households were made up of individuals, and 6.8% had someone living alone who was 65 years of age or older. The average household size was 3.21 and the average family size was 3.59.

The median age in the city was 34.8 years. 36.6% of residents were under the age of 18; 2.2% were between the ages of 18 and 24; 26.9% were from 25 to 44; 19.4% were from 45 to 64; and 15.1% were 65 years of age or older. The gender makeup of the city was 53.8% male and 46.2% female.

=== 2000 census ===
As of the census of 2000, there were 75 people, 27 households, and 18 families living in the city. The population density was 112.2 inhabitants per square mile (43.3/km^{2}). There were 29 housing units at an average density of 43.4 per square mile (16.8/km^{2}). The racial makeup of the city was 81.33% White and 18.67% Native American.

There were 27 households, out of which 29.6% had children under the age of 18 living with them, 63.0% were married couples living together, 3.7% had a female householder with no husband present, and 33.3% were non-families. 22.2% of all households were made up of individuals, and 7.4% had someone living alone who was 65 years of age or older. The average household size was 2.78 and the average family size was 3.00.

In the city, the population was spread out, with 36.0% under the age of 18, 6.7% from 18 to 24, 17.3% from 25 to 44, 29.3% from 45 to 64, and 10.7% who were 65 years of age or older. The median age was 32 years. For every 100 females, there were 141.9 males. For every 100 females age 18 and over, there were 108.7 males.

The median income for a household in the city was $25,750, and the median income for a family was $28,125. Males had a median income of $23,542 versus $11,250 for females. The per capita income for the city was $10,615. There were 15.4% of families and 19.7% of the population living below the poverty line, including 27.8% of under eighteens and none of those over 64.
