= Minnesota State Highway 6 =

Highway in Minnesota

Trunk Highway 6
- MN 6 highlighted in red

Route information
- Maintained by MnDOT
- Length: 147.775 mi (237.821 km)
- Existed: 1920, 1933–present

Major junctions
- South end: MN 18 near Garrison
- MN 210 at Deerwood and Crosby; MN 200 at Remer; US 2 at Deer River; MN 286 at Talmoon; MN 1 near Effie
- North end: US 71 in Big Falls

Location
- Country: United States
- State: Minnesota
- Counties: Crow Wing, Cass, Itasca, Koochiching

Highway system
- Minnesota Trunk Highway System; Interstate; US; State; Legislative; Scenic
← MN 5	→ MN 7

Minnesota State Highway 6 (MN 6) is a 147.775-mile-long (237.821 km) highway in east-central and north-central Minnesota, which runs from its intersection with State Highway 18 in Bay Lake Township near Garrison and continues north to its northern terminus at its intersection with U.S. Highway 71 and County Road 30 in Big Falls.

== Route description ==
State Highway 6 serves as a north–south route between Bay Lake Township, Deerwood, Crosby, Remer, Deer River, and Big Falls in east-central and north-central Minnesota.

The route passes through the Chippewa National Forest in Cass and Itasca counties.

Highway 6 passes through the following state forests:

- Crow Wing State Forest (briefly) in Crow Wing County
- Land O'Lakes State Forest in Cass County
- Remer State Forest in Cass County
- Big Fork State Forest in Itasca County
- Koochiching State Forest in Koochiching County

Schoolcraft State Park is located on Highway 6 in Cass County on the banks of the Mississippi River. The park is located south of Deer River and west of Grand Rapids.

Highway 6 parallels U.S. Highway 169 for part of its route in northern Minnesota.

The route also parallels scenic State Highway 38 for part of its route.

== History ==
State Highway 6 was authorized in 1920 between Remer and Big Falls. The section between Garrison and Remer was authorized in 1933. The route was designated as Highway 6 in 1934.

Highway 6 was completely paved by 1970.

== Major intersections ==
County	Location	mi	km	Destinations	Notes
Crow Wing	Bay Lake Township	0.000	0.000	MN 18 – Garrison, Brainerd	
Crow Wing	Deerwood	9.432	15.179	MN 210 east – Aitkin	Eastern end of MN 210 overlap
Crow Wing	Crosby	13.828	22.254	MN 210 west – Brainerd	Western end of MN 210 overlap
Crow Wing	Wolford Township	18.381– 18.427	29.581– 29.655	Bridge over the Mississippi River	
Cass	Remer Township	55.573	89.436	MN 200 west – Walker	Western end of MN 200 overlap
Cass	Remer	56.344	90.677	MN 200 east – Hill City	Eastern end of MN 200 overlap
Itasca	Deer Lake	70.840– 70.882	114.006– 114.074	Bridge over the Mississippi River	
Itasca	Deer Lake	77.522	124.760	US 2 east – Grand Rapids	Eastern end of US 2 overlap
Itasca	Deer River	83.064	133.679	US 2 west – Bemidji	Western end of US 2 overlap
Itasca	Talmoon	109.205	175.748	MN 286 east / CSAH 4 west – Marcell	
Itasca	Unorganized Territory of Effie	120.202	193.446	MN 1 east – Effie	South end of MN 1 overlap
Koochiching	Unorganized Territory of Northome	122.584	197.280	MN 1 west – Northome	North end of MN 1 overlap
Koochiching	Big Falls	147.775	237.821	US 71 – International Falls, Bemidji	
1.000 mi = 1.609 km; 1.000 km = 0.621 mi: Concurrency terminus
