= Bigfork =

Bigfork or Big Fork may refer to the following places in the United States:

- Big Fork, Arkansas
- Bigfork, Minnesota
- Bigfork Township, Itasca County, Minnesota
- Bigfork, Montana
- Big Fork River, Minnesota
- Big Fork State Forest, Minnesota
