= Marcell, Minnesota =

Unincorporated community in Minnesota, United States

Marcell
- Unincorporated community
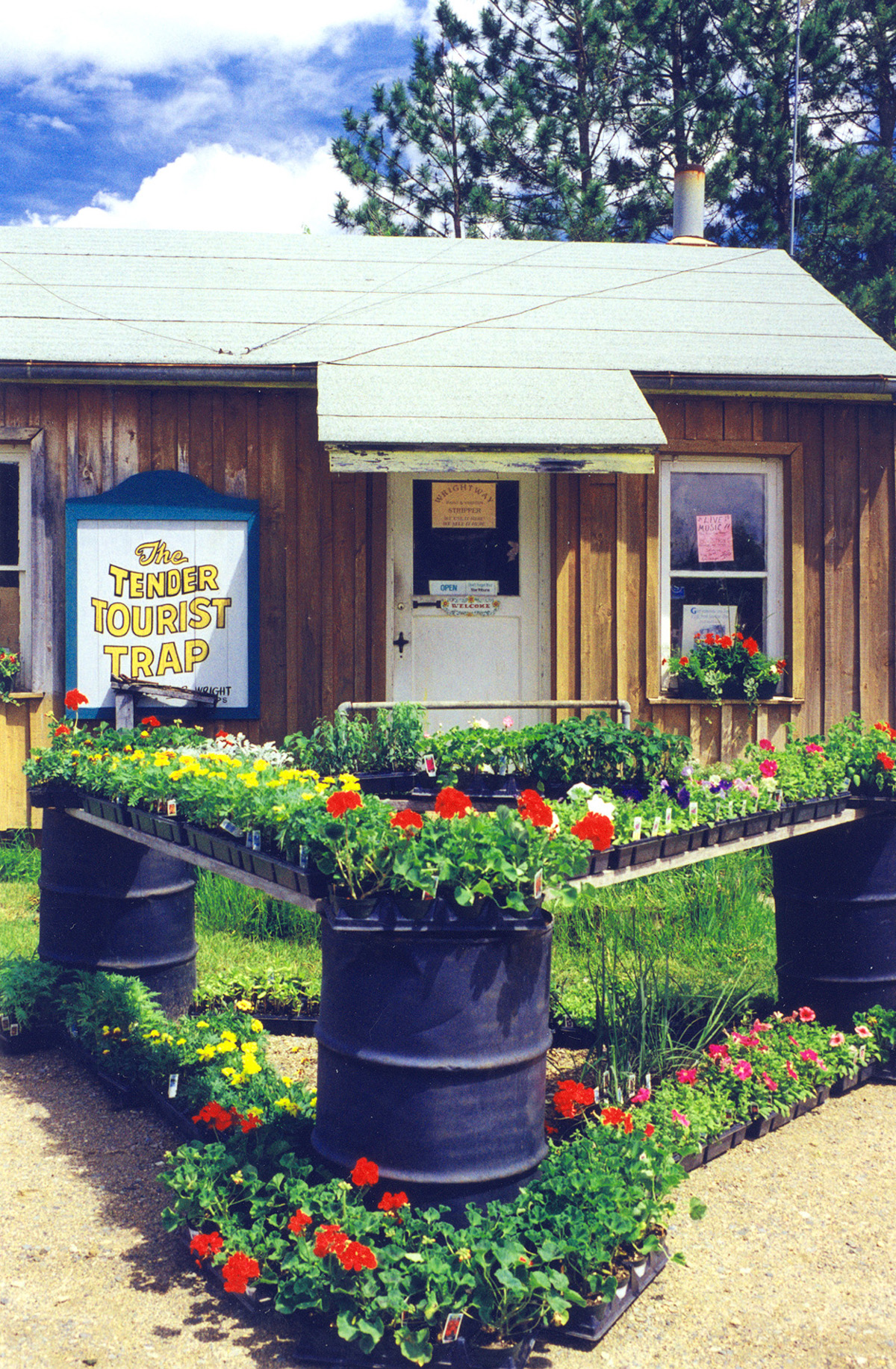
- Flats of perennials greet visitors at the Tender Tourist Trap in Marcell, MN

- Location within Minnesota Location within the United States
- Coordinates: 47°35′35″N 93°41′27″W
- Country: United States
- State: Minnesota
- County: Itasca
- Township: Marcell Township
- Elevation: 1,391 ft (424 m)

Population
  - Total: 100
- Time zone: UTC-6 (Central (CST))
  - Summer (DST): UTC-5 (CDT)
- ZIP code: 56657
- Area code: 218
- GNIS feature ID: 657317

Marcell is an unincorporated community in Marcell Township, Itasca County, Minnesota, United States.

Minnesota State Highways 38 and 286 are two of the main routes in the community.

Marcell is located 28 miles north of Grand Rapids. The community is located within the Chippewa National Forest.

Nearby places include Bigfork, Talmoon, Bowstring, Deer River, and Effie.

Despite its unincorporated status, Marcell appears on most more detailed maps of Minnesota due to the presence of several locally important businesses and the lack of larger communities in the surrounding area. In addition, it has its own post office with the ZIP code 56657.

== History ==
Marcell was founded under the name Turtle Lake in 1905. The name was changed to Marcell the following year due to a name conflict with other communities named Turtle Lake. The name Marcell is in honor of Andy Marcell, a conductor on the former Minneapolis and Rainy River Railway, who was involved in a railway accident in the area.

The site of the town center was originally at a store operated by John Lundeen on Big Turtle Lake, but was moved in 1910 to its present location near the railway.

== Climate ==
Climate data for Marcell 5NE, Minnesota, 1991–2020 normals, 1981-2020 extremes: 1387ft (423m)
Month	Jan	Feb	Mar	Apr	May	Jun	Jul	Aug	Sep	Oct	Nov	Dec	Year
Record high °F (°C)	46 (8)	54 (12)	64 (18)	82 (28)	91 (33)	92 (33)	93 (34)	96 (36)	91 (33)	80 (27)	67 (19)	50 (10)	96 (36)
Mean maximum °F (°C)	36.6 (2.6)	42.8 (6.0)	55.0 (12.8)	71.7 (22.1)	81.4 (27.4)	85.1 (29.5)	86.1 (30.1)	86.5 (30.3)	81.0 (27.2)	71.8 (22.1)	52.6 (11.4)	38.8 (3.8)	87.0 (30.6)
Mean daily maximum °F (°C)	15.7 (−9.1)	22.1 (−5.5)	35.6 (2.0)	49.3 (9.6)	62.9 (17.2)	71.9 (22.2)	76.8 (24.9)	74.8 (23.8)	66.0 (18.9)	50.9 (10.5)	33.9 (1.1)	21.2 (−6.0)	48.4 (9.1)
Daily mean °F (°C)	5.5 (−14.7)	9.7 (−12.4)	23.8 (−4.6)	38.1 (3.4)	51.5 (10.8)	61.9 (16.6)	66.3 (19.1)	64.8 (18.2)	56.5 (13.6)	42.7 (5.9)	26.9 (−2.8)	13.2 (−10.4)	38.4 (3.6)
Mean daily minimum °F (°C)	−4.7 (−20.4)	−2.6 (−19.2)	12.0 (−11.1)	26.9 (−2.8)	40.2 (4.6)	51.9 (11.1)	55.8 (13.2)	54.8 (12.7)	46.9 (8.3)	34.6 (1.4)	19.9 (−6.7)	5.1 (−14.9)	28.4 (−2.0)
Mean minimum °F (°C)	−30.1 (−34.5)	−25.1 (−31.7)	−10.0 (−23.3)	12.9 (−10.6)	27.3 (−2.6)	37.9 (3.3)	45.9 (7.7)	44.2 (6.8)	31.7 (−0.2)	21.9 (−5.6)	0.3 (−17.6)	−24.3 (−31.3)	−31.6 (−35.3)
Record low °F (°C)	−48 (−44)	−51 (−46)	−31 (−35)	−3 (−19)	19 (−7)	28 (−2)	40 (4)	35 (2)	26 (−3)	10 (−12)	−15 (−26)	−39 (−39)	−51 (−46)
Average precipitation inches (mm)	0.91 (23)	0.77 (20)	1.32 (34)	2.20 (56)	3.15 (80)	4.21 (107)	5.90 (150)	3.46 (88)	3.71 (94)	2.66 (68)	1.57 (40)	1.26 (32)	31.12 (792)
Average snowfall inches (cm)	14.10 (35.8)	10.00 (25.4)	7.70 (19.6)	5.20 (13.2)	0.20 (0.51)	0.00 (0.00)	0.00 (0.00)	0.00 (0.00)	0.00 (0.00)	1.20 (3.0)	12.90 (32.8)	12.80 (32.5)	64.1 (162.81)
Source 1: NOAA
Source 2: XMACIS (temp records & 1981-2010 monthly max/mins)
