= Minnesota Scenic Byways =

System of roads in Minnesota, United States

System information
- Length: 2,948 mi (4,744 km)
- Formed: 1992

System links
- Minnesota Trunk Highway System; Interstate; US; State; Legislative; Scenic

Minnesota Scenic Byways are a system of roads in the U.S. state of Minnesota which pass through areas of scenic, cultural, or recreational significance. There are currently 22 scenic byways in the system with a total length of 2,948 miles (4,744 km). Eight of these byways are also designated as National Scenic Byways, and the North Shore Scenic Drive is further designated as an All-American Road.

Minnesota's scenic byway program was established in 1992 as a joint effort between the Minnesota Department of Transportation, Minnesota Department of Natural Resources, Minnesota Office of Tourism, and Minnesota Historical Society. The Minnesota Scenic Byways Commission began designating byways in 1994.

== Byways ==
=== Apple Blossom Drive Scenic Byway ===
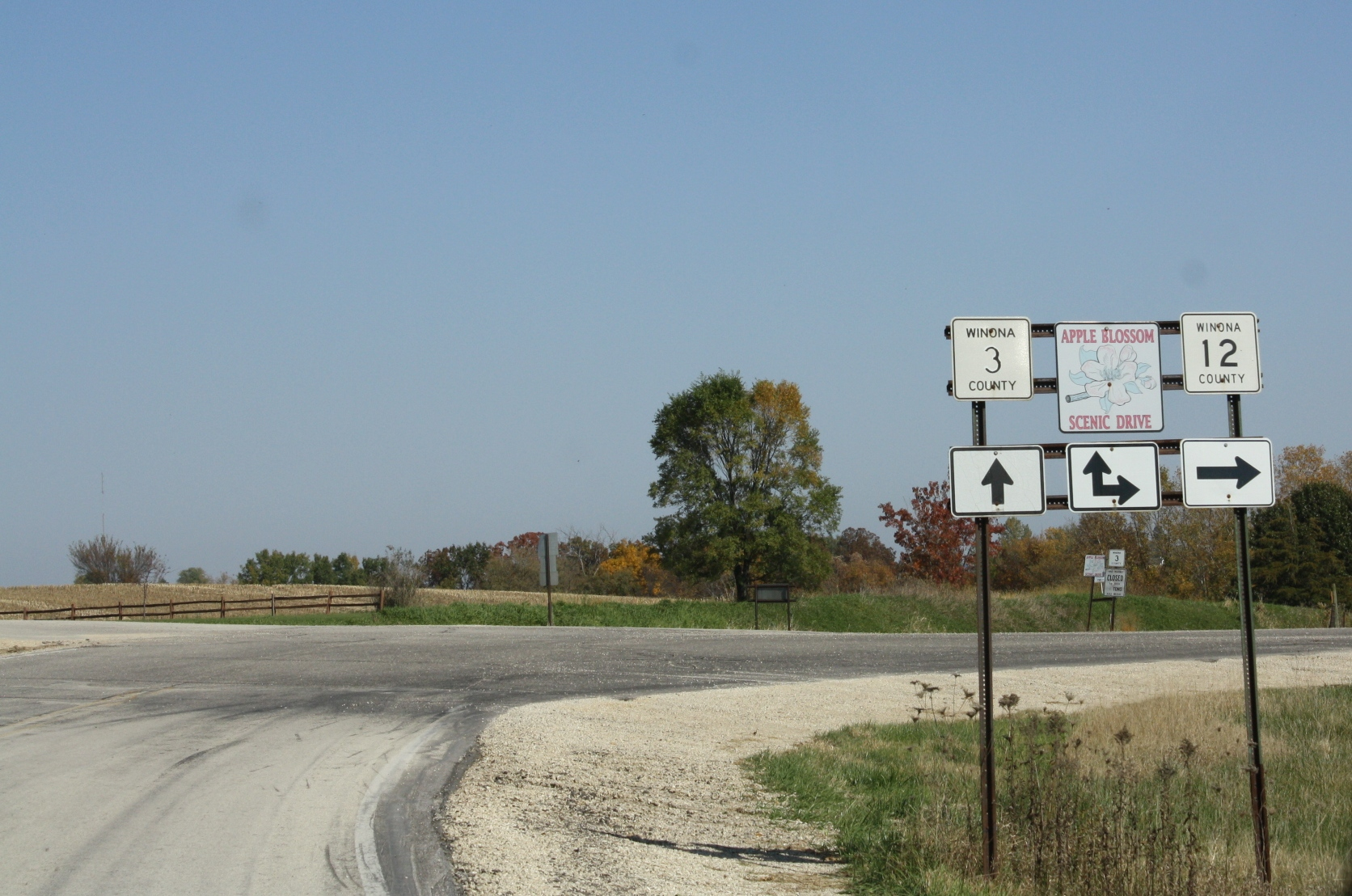
Apple Blossom Drive Scenic Byway

Apple Blossom Drive Scenic Byway is a 19-mile (31 km) route in southeastern Minnesota that runs from La Crescent to U.S. Highway 61 north of Donehower. The highway meets the Great River Road at both ends and provides access to Great River Bluffs State Park. As its name suggests, many apple orchards are along the highway.

=== Avenue of Pines Scenic Byway ===
Avenue of Pines Scenic Byway consists of the entirety of Minnesota State Highway 46, a 46.4-mile (74.7 km) road which connects U.S. Highway 2 in Deer River to the south with Minnesota State Highway 1 in Northome. The route passes through the Chippewa National Forest and provides views of pine stands and several lakes, including Lake Winnibigoshish.

=== Edge of the Wilderness National Scenic Byway ===
Edge of the Wilderness National Scenic Byway consists of the entirety of Minnesota State Highway 38, a 46.8-mile (75.3 km) road which links U.S. Highway 2 in Grand Rapids with Minnesota State Highway 1 in Effie. A former logging road, the byway passes several lakes and enters the Chippewa National Forest.

=== Glacial Ridge Trail Scenic Byway ===
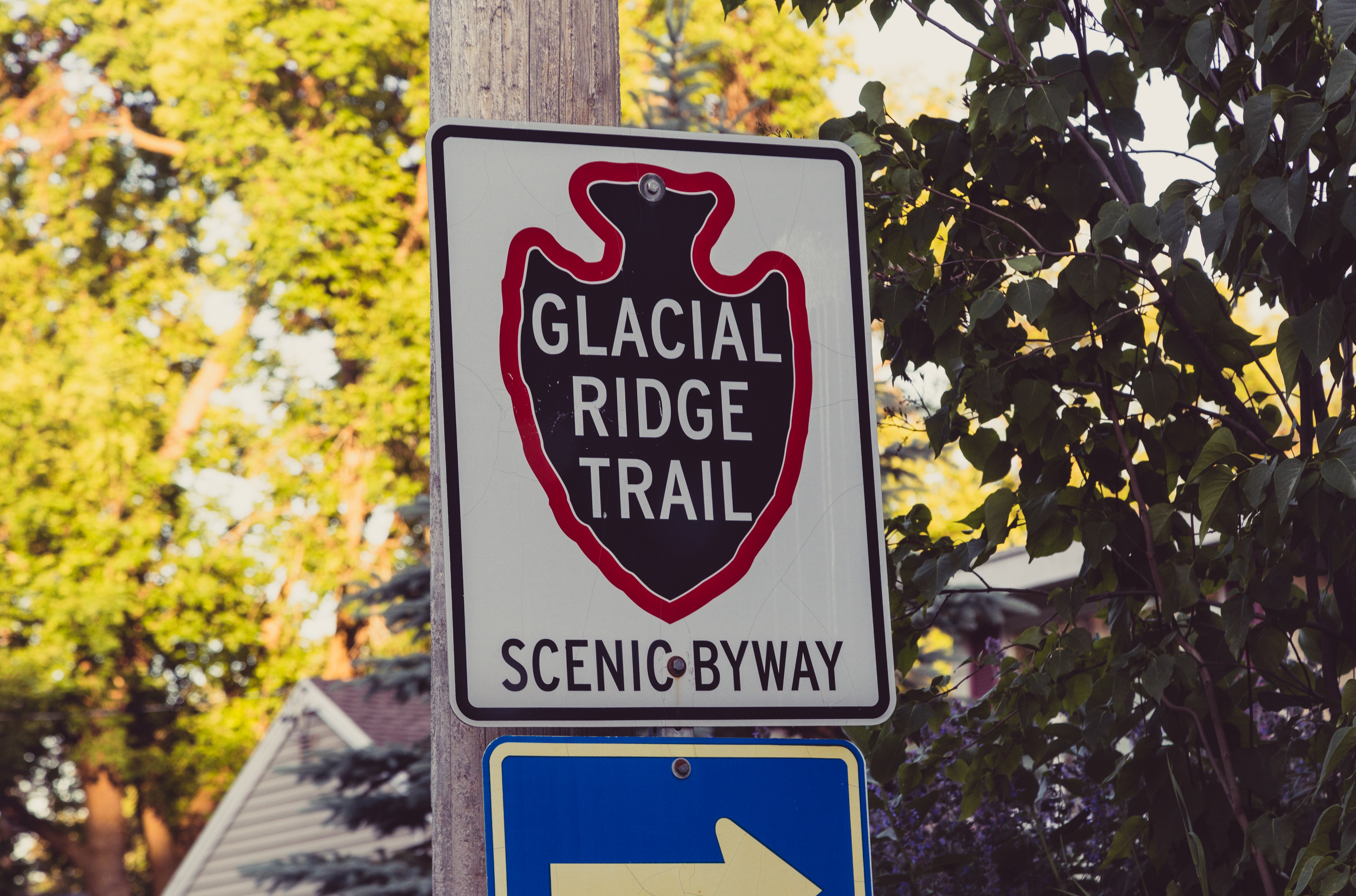
Glacial Ridge Trail Scenic Byway signage

Glacial Ridge Trail Scenic Byway is a 220-mile (350 km) route in central Minnesota with several loops and spurs. The landscape along the route was formed by glaciers, the evidence of which can be seen in its many glacial lakes and ridges. Sibley State Park, Monson Lake State Park, and Glacial Lakes State Park are along the byway.

=== Grand Rounds National Scenic Byway ===
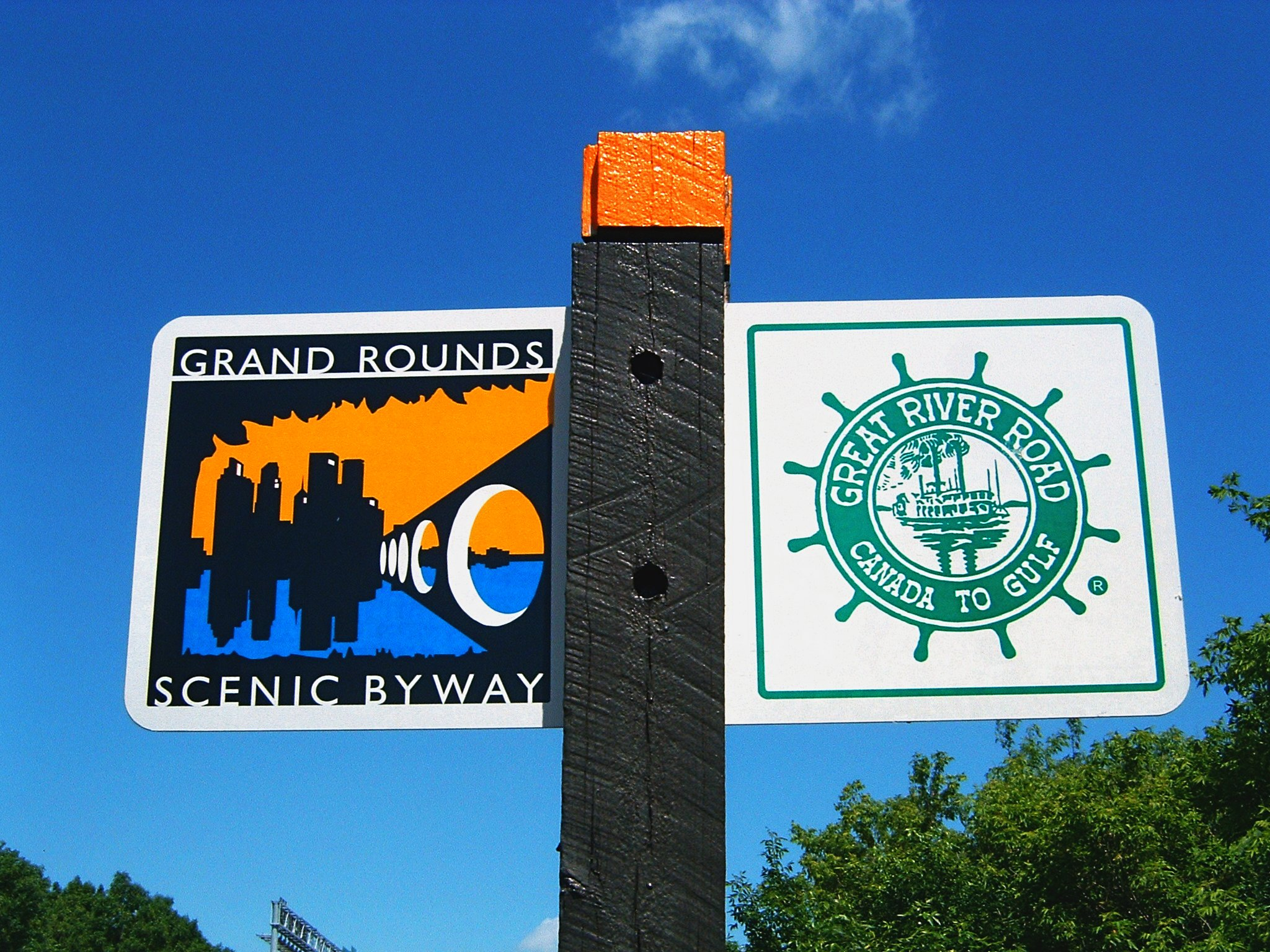
Grand Rounds National Scenic Byway and the Great River Road

Grand Rounds National Scenic Byway is a 46-mile (74 km) network of roads, bicycle paths, and pedestrian paths in Minneapolis and its neighboring suburbs. The byway begins in downtown Minneapolis and follows the Mississippi River to the city's southern edge before looping along its western and northern borders. It connects downtown attractions, numerous parks and historic sites, and the city's Chain of Lakes.

=== Great River Road National Scenic Byway ===
The Great River Road follows the Mississippi River on both banks from its source in Minnesota to its mouth in Louisiana, entering ten states in total. The 565-mile (909 km) Minnesota portion of the road connects its source at Itasca State Park to the Iowa border in the state's southeastern tip. Along the way, the road passes through twenty of the state's counties and several of its major cities, including both Minneapolis and St. Paul.

=== Gunflint Trail National Scenic Byway ===
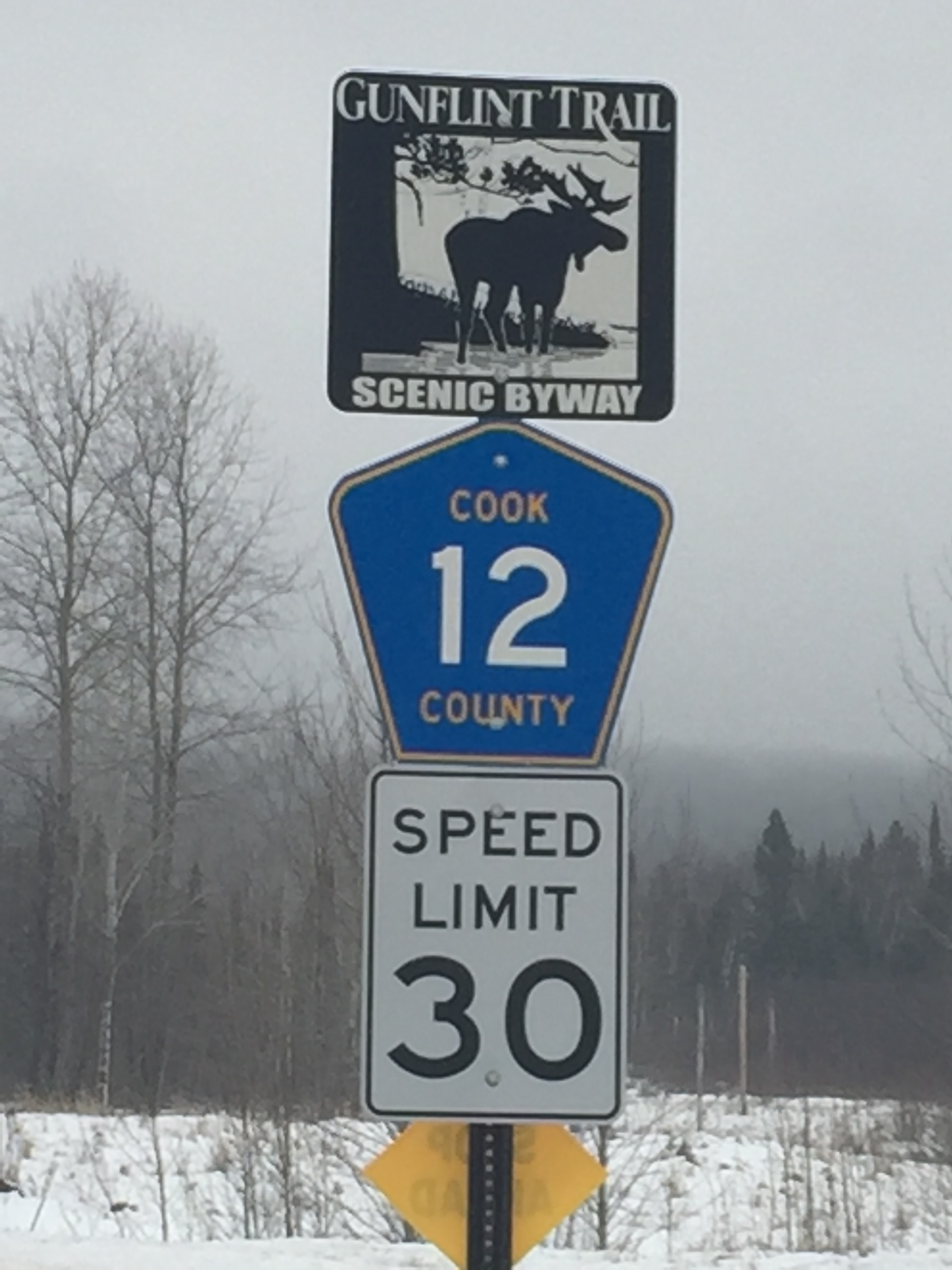
Gunflint Trail Scenic Byway signage

Gunflint Trail National Scenic Byway is a 57-mile (92 km) road following County Road 12 in Cook County, Minnesota's northeastern tip. The byway begins in Grand Marais and passes through Superior National Forest and the Boundary Waters Canoe Area Wilderness. Many recreational opportunities exist along the road, including lakes with fishing and canoe access, hiking trails, and campsites.

=== Historic Bluff Country National Scenic Byway ===
Historic Bluff Country National Scenic Byway is an alternate designation for Minnesota State Highway 16, an 87.7-mile (141.1 km) highway in southeastern Minnesota. The route follows the Root River through the hills, bluffs, and valleys of the Driftless Area. The river provides fishing, canoeing, and other recreational opportunities. Much of Minnesota's Amish population lives along the route.

=== Highway 75 King of Trails Scenic Byway ===
The Highway 75 King of Trails Scenic Byway includes all of U.S. Highway 75's 414-mile (666 km) route through western Minnesota. The highway passes through Minnesota's prairie regions and passes Pipestone National Monument as well as multiple state parks.

=== Lady Slipper Scenic Byway ===
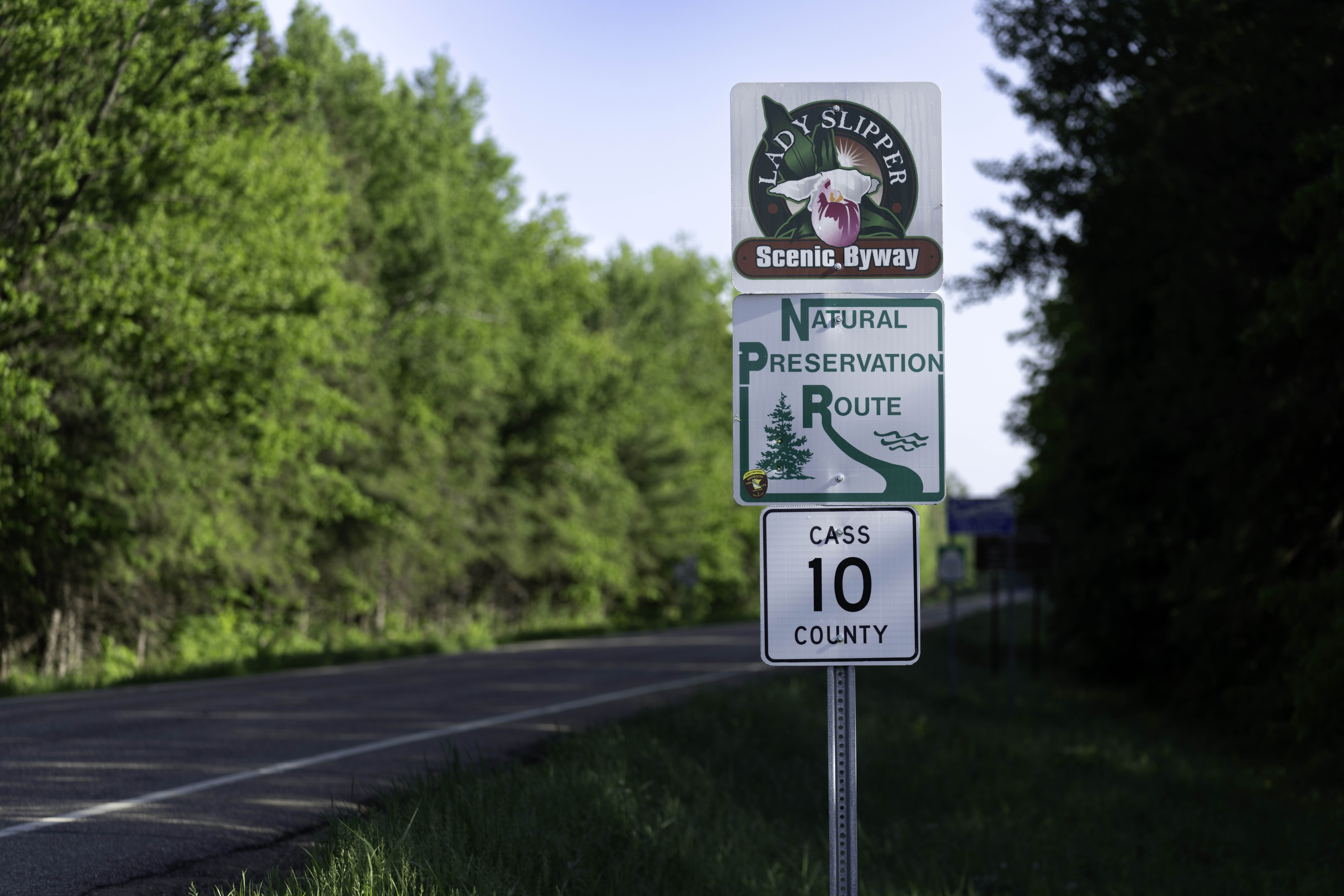
Lady Slipper Scenic Byway sign in Cass County, Minnesota

Lady Slipper Scenic Byway is a 21-mile (34 km) route between U.S. Highway 2 in Cass Lake and U.S. Highway 71 in Blackduck. The route passes through the Chippewa National Forest and features views of many lakes and forested areas. It also provides access to the Rabideau CCC Camp. Its name comes from the lady slippers which bloom in the area in summer.

=== Lake Country Scenic Byway ===
Lake Country Scenic Byway is a three-legged 88-mile (142 km) route in north central Minnesota. Its legs meet in Park Rapids and lead to Detroit Lakes, Minnesota, Itasca State Park, and Walker. The route passes many of Minnesota's lakes and provides birdwatching opportunities through access to the Pine to Prairie Birding Trail and Tamarac National Wildlife Refuge.

=== Lake Mille Lacs Scenic Byway ===
Lake Mille Lacs Scenic Byway is a 68-mile (109 km) road encircling Lake Mille Lacs. The road includes parts of Minnesota State Highway 18, Minnesota State Highway 27, Minnesota State Highway 47, and Minnesota State Highway 169. Attractions along the byway include Father Hennepin State Park, Mille Lacs Kathio State Park, views of the lake and Mille Lacs National Wildlife Refuge, and several historic sites.

=== Minnesota River Valley National Scenic Byway ===
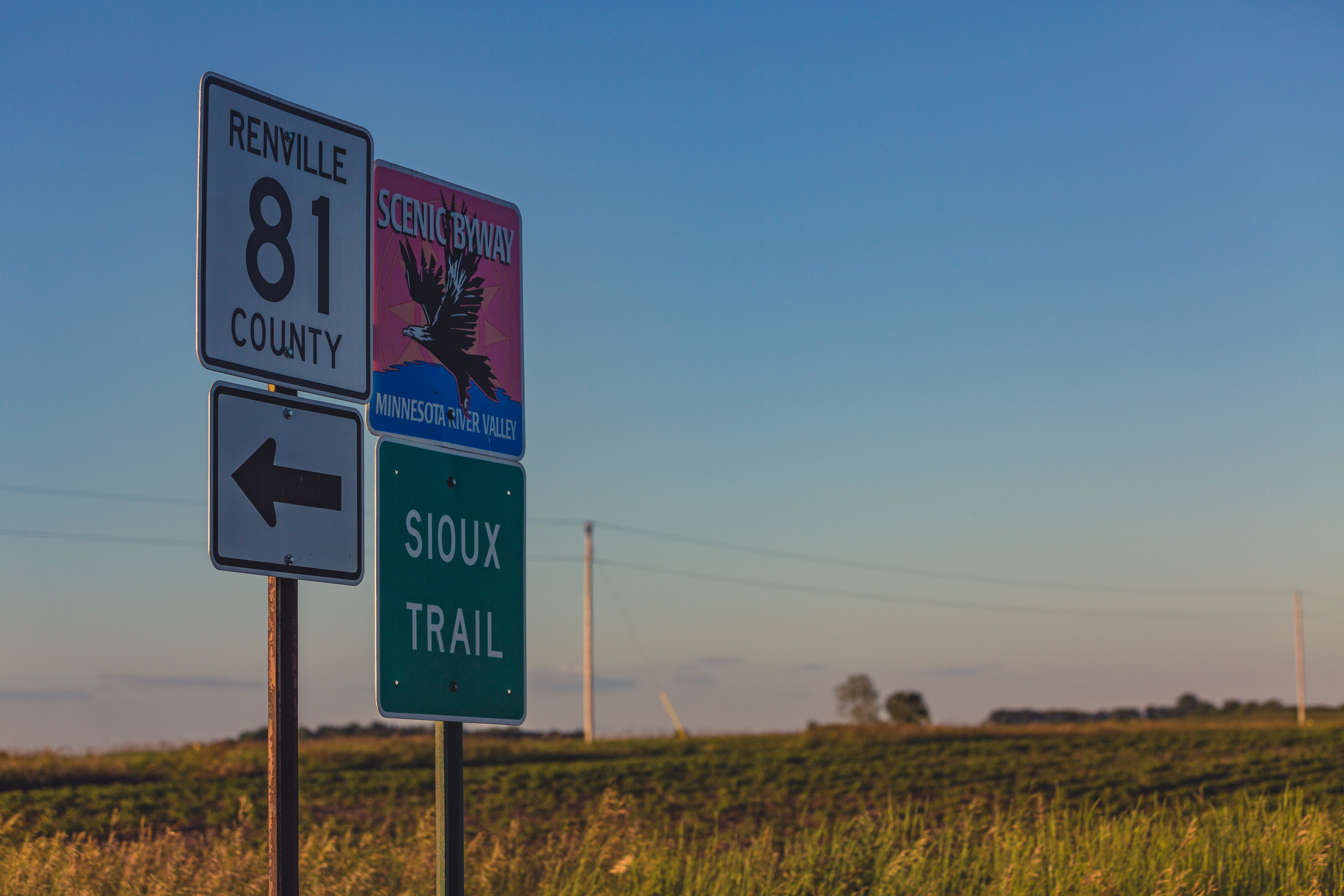
Minnesota River Valley National Scenic Byway in Renville County

Minnesota River Valley National Scenic Byway is a 300-mile (480 km) highway following the Minnesota River from its source at Big Stone Lake to Belle Plaine. The route passes through several small riverside towns and access points to canoeing on the river. It also connects several historic sites related to the Dakota people and the Dakota War of 1862.

=== North Shore All-American Scenic Drive ===
North Shore Scenic Drive is a 154-mile (248 km) route that follows the North Shore of Lake Superior between Duluth and Grand Portage. While much of the route is shared with Minnesota State Highway 61, it follows county highways which run closer to the lake along its southern portions. The byway links seven of Minnesota's state parks, Split Rock Lighthouse, historic sites related to the fishing and fur trading industries, and the Superior Hiking Trail.

=== Otter Trail Scenic Byway ===
Otter Trail Scenic Byway is a 150-mile (240 km) loop route in Otter Tail County. The route passes Glendalough State Park, Maplewood State Park, and hundreds of lakes. It also runs through several of the county's main cities, including the county seat of Fergus Falls, and historic sites.

=== Paul Bunyan National Scenic Byway ===
Paul Bunyan National Scenic Byway is a 54-mile (87 km) route through central Minnesota. The highway, which takes its name from the legend of Paul Bunyan, runs through an area with numerous lakes and connects the resort towns of Crosslake, Pequot Lakes, and Pine River. Recreational opportunities along the byway include fishing, cycling, hiking, and bird watching.

=== Saint Croix Scenic Byway ===
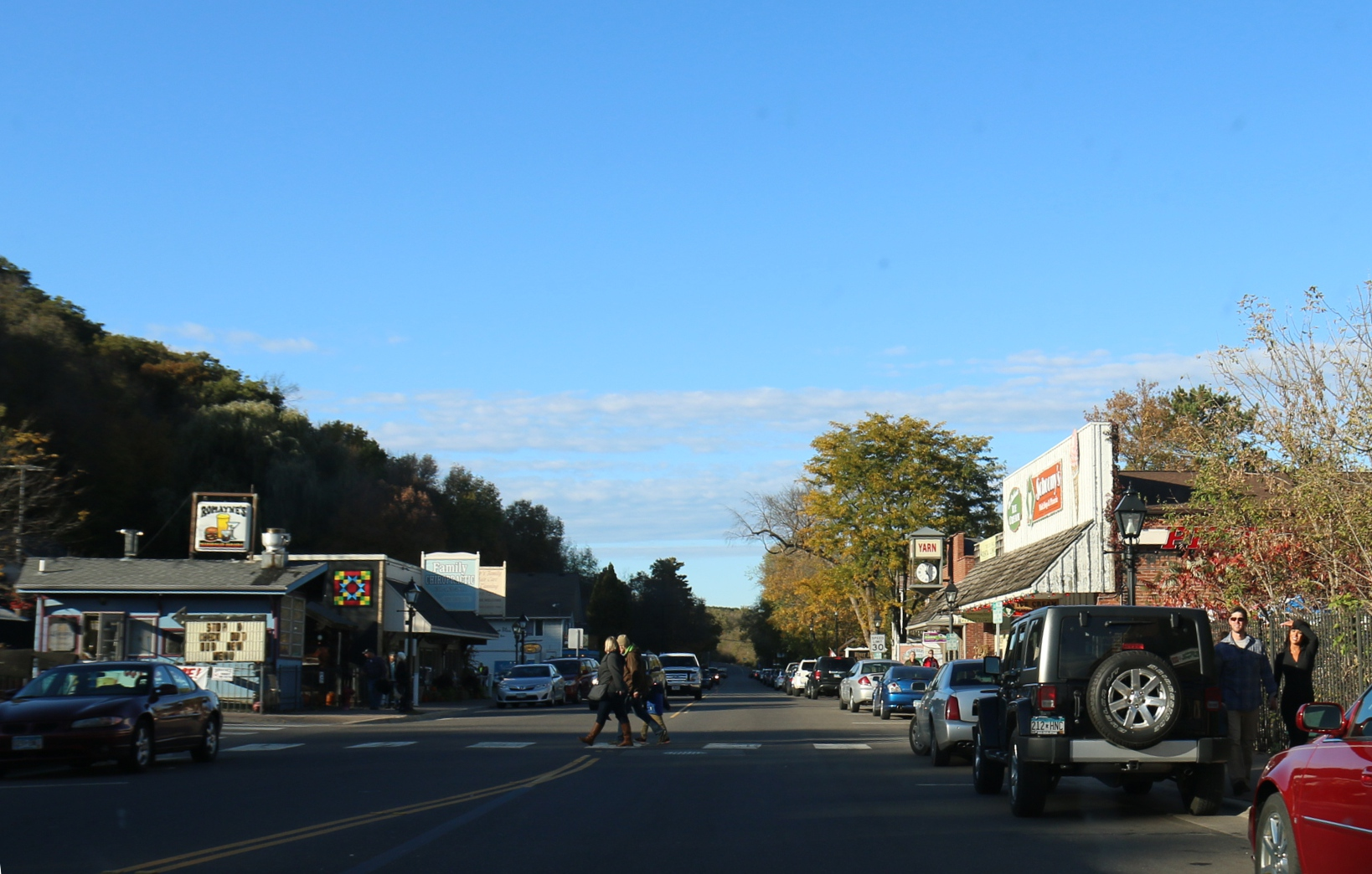
The Saint Croix Scenic Byway in downtown Taylors Falls

Saint Croix Scenic Byway is a 124-mile (200 km) route that follows the St. Croix River, which forms part of Minnesota's eastern border. The route runs from U.S. Highway 10 near Hastings to Sandstone. The byway connects the flatter landscapes of southern Minnesota with the forested, hilly landscapes of northern Minnesota.

=== Shooting Star Scenic Byway ===
Shooting Star Scenic Byway is a 31-mile (50 km) route which follows part of Minnesota State Highway 56 in southern Minnesota. One of the first scenic byways designated for wildflower viewing, the route provides views of wildflowers and native grasses managed by the Minnesota Department of Natural Resources. Lake Louise State Park and several small towns are along the byway.

=== Skyline Parkway ===
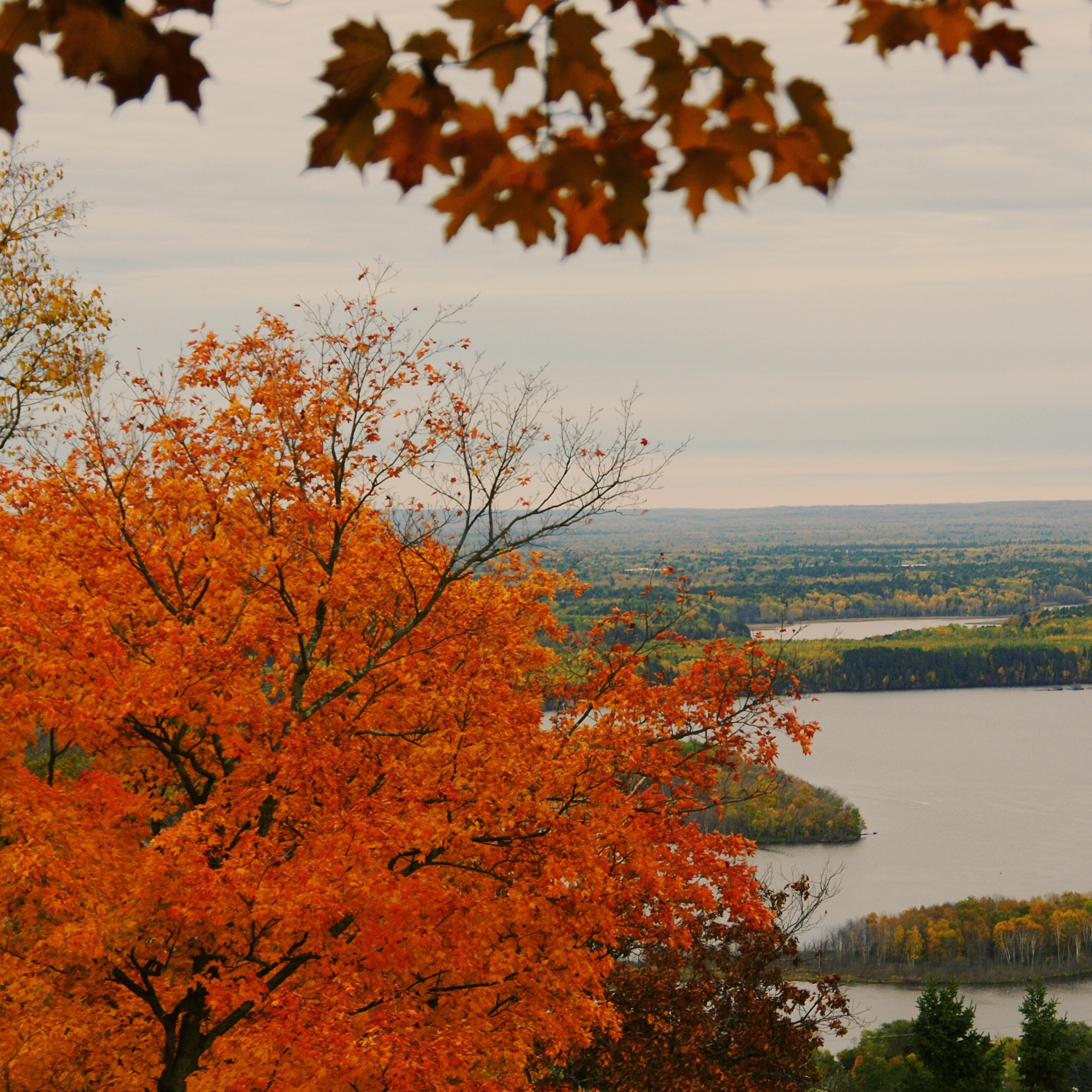
View of Spirit Lake from Skyline Parkway

Skyline Parkway is a 28-mile (45 km) route overlooking Duluth and Lake Superior. The byway provides scenic views, birdwatching at Hawk Ridge, and access to mountain biking and hiking paths. Numerous waterfalls can be seen from the route.

=== Superior National Forest Scenic Byway ===
Superior National Forest Scenic Byway is a 61-mile (98 km) through the Superior National Forest in northeastern Minnesota. Passing through a sparsely populated area, the byway provides scenic forest views and access to hawk watching and boating sites. Historic sites such as the Toimi School and the Timber Arch Bridge can also be found along the route.

=== Veterans Evergreen Memorial Drive ===
Veterans Evergreen Memorial Drive is a 50-mile (80 km) route following Minnesota State Highway 23 from Interstate 35 at Banning State Park to Duluth. The highway serves as a scenic bypass of Interstate 35 for travelers between the Twin Cities and Duluth. It also crosses several rivers and creeks with fishing and canoeing access.

=== Waters of the Dancing Sky Scenic Byway ===
Waters of the Dancing Sky Scenic Byway runs for 229 miles (369 km) near Minnesota's northern border, linking the North Dakota border with Voyageurs National Park. The western section of the byway, between North Dakota and Warroad follows the Pine to Prairie Birding Trail, which features birdwatching opportunities. The section from Warroad to Baudette passes through areas full of wildflowers, particularly lady slippers. A spur from Baudette connects the route to Zippel Bay State Park. East of Baudette, the route follows the Rainy River, a popular fishing site. The byway's name comes from a nickname for the Aurora Borealis, which can be seen from many points along the route.
