= Bigfork Village Hall =

- U.S. National Register of Historic Places
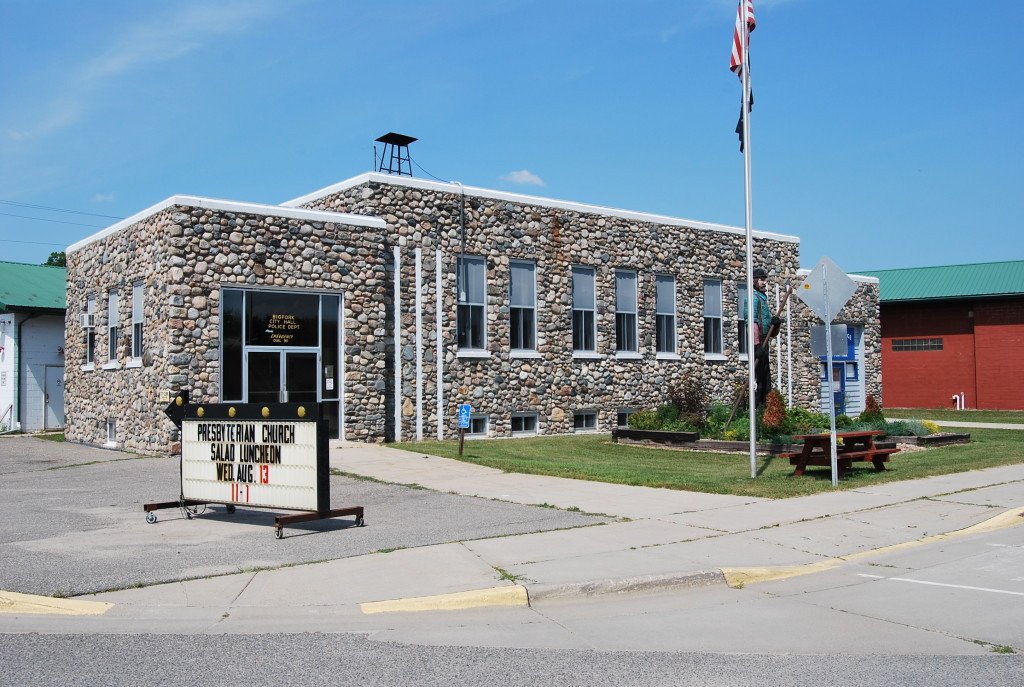

- Location within Minnesota Location within the United States
- Location: 200 Main Avenue; Bigfork, Minnesota
- Coordinates: 47°44′38″N 93°39′18″W
- Area: Less than one acre
- Architect: J. C. Taylor
- NRHP reference No.: 12000871
- Designated NRHP: 2012-10-17

Bigfork Village Hall is a historic fieldstone municipal hall built in 1936 with Works Progress Administration funds to provide a government and community center in Bigfork, Minnesota, United States. It remains at its original location on Minnesota State Highway 38 and is listed on the National Register of Historic Places.

== See also ==
- List of city and town halls in the United States
