= Lost 40 =

Coordinates: 47.767°N 94.085°W

The Lost Forty (or Lost 40) is 144 acres of old-growth pine forest located in Minnesota that was preserved due to a surveying error during the Public Land Survey in 1882.

== History ==
During the Public Land Survey in 1882, surveyors mistakenly mapped the area as Coddington Lake, which is actually located half of a mile southeast, leading to the area not being logged.

The area was re-surveyed in 1960, with the error corrected. Following this, the area was incorporated into Big Fork State Forest. The Lost Forty is part of the Chippewa National Forest Recreation Region.

== Significance ==
Based on a 2009 study, the oldest individual trees within this area to be 230-240 years old red pines. However, conflicting sources cite these trees to be over 300-400 years old.

In present day, less than 2% of Minnesota's forests contain old-growth trees.
