= Bigfork, Minnesota =

City in Minnesota, United States

Bigfork
- City
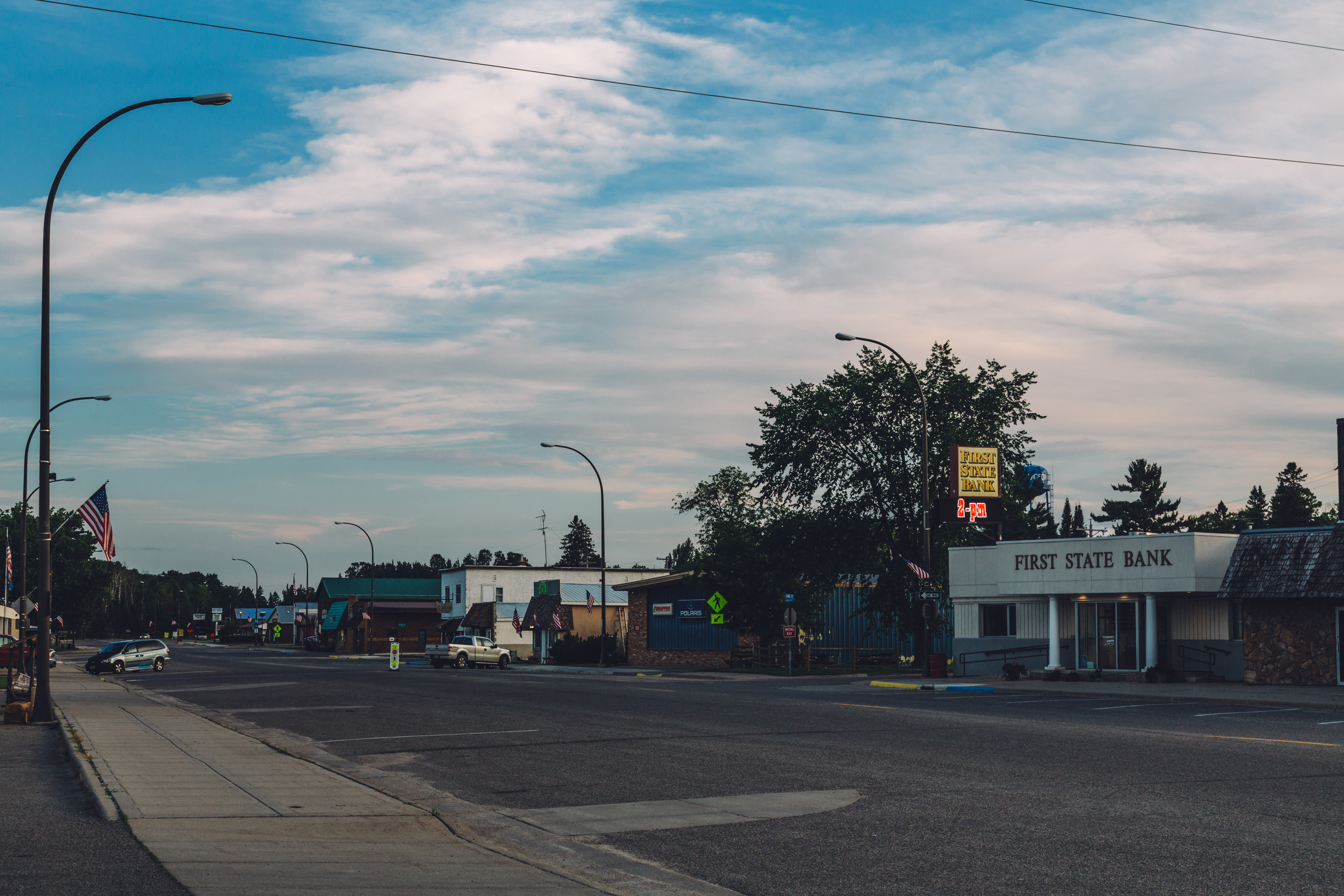
- Main Street - Bigfork, Minnesota

- Location of the city of Bigfork within Itasca County, Minnesota
- Coordinates: 47°44′49″N 93°39′18″W
- Country: United States
- State: Minnesota
- County: Itasca
- Established: considered a village in 1907

Area
  - Total: 1.89 sq mi (4.90 km^{2})
  - Land: 1.86 sq mi (4.81 km^{2})
  - Water: 0.035 sq mi (0.09 km^{2})
- Elevation: 1,309 ft (399 m)

Population (2020)
  - Total: 400
  - Density: 215.2/sq mi (83.09/km^{2})
- Time zone: UTC-6 (Central (CST))
  - Summer (DST): UTC-5 (CDT)
- ZIP codes: 56628, 56639
- Area code: 218
- FIPS code: 27-05698
- GNIS feature ID: 0655384
- Website: www.cityofbigfork.com

Bigfork is a city in Itasca County, Minnesota, United States. The population was 400 at the 2020 census. Scenic State Park is nearby.

Minnesota State Highway 38 serves as a main route in the community. State Highways 1 and 6 are nearby.

== History ==
Bigfork originally began as a settlement when Damase "Uncle Tom" Neveaux built a log cabin on the Big Fork River, claiming the stand of pine there, and began logging activities. Though Neveaux reached the area in 1887, and the settlement began in 1892, officially, he was a squatter until the land was opened for settlement in 1900.

By 1902, a post office was established, and in 1906, a station was added to the Minneapolis and Rainy River Railway.

On January 17, 1907, less than a year after the railway stop was completed, Bigfork was incorporated as a village. Bigfork Village Hall, built in 1936 with WPA funds, is listed on the National Register of Historic Places.

== Geography ==
According to the United States Census Bureau, the city has a total area of 1.80 square miles (4.66 km^{2}), of which 1.77 square miles (4.58 km^{2}) is land and 0.03 square miles (0.08 km^{2}) is water.

== Demographics ==
Historical population
| Census | Pop. | Note | %± |
|---|---|---|---|
| 1910 | 167 | | — |
| 1920 | 160 | | −4.2% |
| 1930 | 295 | | 84.4% |
| 1940 | 382 | | 29.5% |
| 1950 | 463 | | 21.2% |
| 1960 | 464 | | 0.2% |
| 1970 | 399 | | −14.0% |
| 1980 | 457 | | 14.5% |
| 1990 | 384 | | −16.0% |
| 2000 | 469 | | 22.1% |
| 2010 | 446 | | −4.9% |
| 2020 | 400 | | −10.3% |
U.S. Decennial Census

=== 2010 census ===
As of the census of 2010, there were 446 people, 195 households, and 102 families living in the city. The population density was 252.0 inhabitants per square mile (97.3/km^{2}). There were 241 housing units at an average density of 136.2 per square mile (52.6/km^{2}). The racial makeup of the city was 97.1% White, 0.7% African American, 1.1% Native American, 0.4% Asian, and 0.7% from two or more races. Hispanic or Latino of any race were 0.4% of the population.

There were 195 households, of which 23.6% had children under the age of 18 living with them, 37.9% were married couples living together, 9.7% had a female householder with no husband present, 4.6% had a male householder with no wife present, and 47.7% were non-families. 42.1% of all households were made up of individuals, and 29.2% had someone living alone who was 65 years of age or older. The average household size was 2.01 and the average family size was 2.74.

The median age in the city was 51.3 years. 17.9% of residents were under the age of 18; 5.2% were between the ages of 18 and 24; 17.8% were from 25 to 44; 25.1% were from 45 to 64; and 34.1% were 65 years of age or older. The gender makeup of the city was 48.2% male and 51.8% female.

=== 2000 census ===
As of the census of 2000, there were 469 people, 208 households, and 110 families living in the city. The population density was 263.5 inhabitants per square mile (101.7/km^{2}). There were 226 housing units at an average density of 127.0 per square mile (49.0/km^{2}). The racial makeup of the city was 97.65% White, 1.71% Native American, 0.21% from other races, and 0.43% from two or more races. Hispanic or Latino of any race were 1.07% of the population.

There were 208 households, out of which 21.2% had children under the age of 18 living with them, 38.0% were married couples living together, 10.1% had a female householder with no husband present, and 47.1% were non-families. 42.8% of all households were made up of individuals, and 24.0% had someone living alone who was 65 years of age or older. The average household size was 2.00 and the average family size was 2.68.

In the city, the population was spread out, with 16.8% under the age of 18, 9.6% from 18 to 24, 21.5% from 25 to 44, 20.5% from 45 to 64, and 31.6% who were 65 years of age or older. The median age was 47 years. For every 100 females, there were 80.4 males. For every 100 females age 18 and over, there were 85.7 males.

The median income for a household in the city was $24,167, and the median income for a family was $36,250. Males had a median income of $32,083 versus $19,886 for females. The per capita income for the city was $14,455. About 6.0% of families and 12.3% of the population were below the poverty line, including 14.3% of those under age 18 and 6.6% of those age 65 or over.

== Media ==
=== Television ===
| Channel | Callsign | Affiliation | Branding | Subchannels | | Owner |
| (Virtual) | Callsign | Affiliation | Branding | Channel | Programming | Owner |
|---|---|---|---|---|---|---|
| 13.1 | K23KZ-D (WIRT Translator) | ABC | WDIO | 13.2; 13.3 | MeTV; Ion Television | EZ-TV, Inc. |
| 21.1 | K21KY-D (KQDS Translator) | FOX | FOX 21 | 21.2 | Antenna TV | EZ-TV, Inc. |
