= Rabideau CCC Camp =

- Rabideau Civilian Conservation Corps Camp
- U.S. National Register of Historic Places
- U.S. National Historic Landmark District
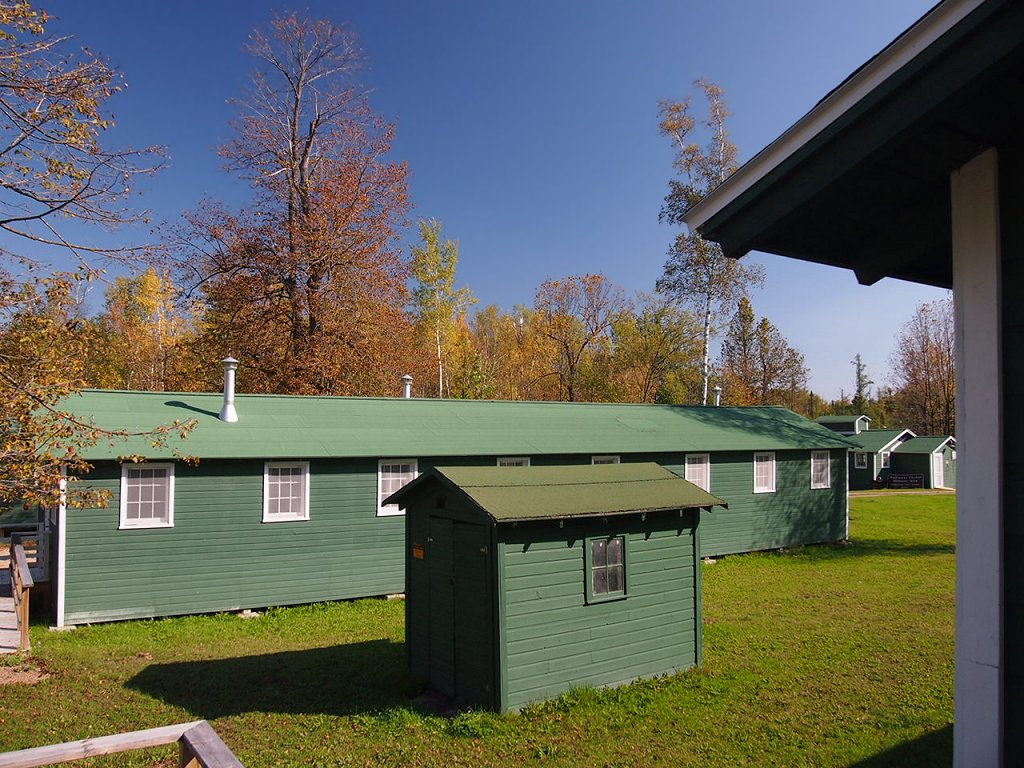
- Rabideau CCC Camp
- Location: Off Co. Hwy. 39 in Chippewa National Forest, Taylor Township
- Nearest city: Blackduck, Minnesota
- Coordinates: 47°38′23.95″N 94°32′55.04″W
- Area: 18.8 acres (7.6 ha)
- Built: 1935–1941
- NRHP reference No.: 76001046

Significant dates
- Added to NRHP: June 16, 1976
- Designated NHLD: February 17, 2006

The Rabideau CCC Camp was a Civilian Conservation Corps (CCC) camp in the Chippewa National Forest in northern Minnesota, United States. It is located off Beltrami County Highway 39, in Taylor Township, and is one of the best-preserved of the nation's many CCC camps. A National Historic Landmark, it now serves as an educational center.

== History ==
The camp was established in 1935 as a project of Franklin D. Roosevelt's New Deal program. The camp, one of 2650 nationwide, was home to about 300 men aged 17–21. Like most CCC camps, the Rabideau camp was established to provide work to those unemployed as a result of the Great Depression. Enrollees at the camp came mostly from Northern Minnesota and worked on projects within the Chippewa National Forest, such as building roads and other facilities, surveying, wildlife protection, and other forestry activities.

Like most other CCC projects, the Rabideau camp was built for temporary occupation. Most CCC camps were abandoned when the United States entered World War II, and most of them fell into disuse. The Rabideau camp survived because the University of Illinois used the buildings for its engineering and forestry schools between 1946 and 1972. Unfortunately, the buildings, being mostly prefabricated and having insubstantial foundations, continued to deteriorate. Rolf Anderson and the Preservation Alliance of Minnesota became involved with the site in 1991. He visited the camp and said, "I knew it was a significant and rare place. It's a remarkable survivor from the New Deal and it has national, not just local, significance. It is a picturesque setting and the visual image is something that most people haven't experienced. The CCC was one of the greatest conservation programs in the history of the United States. It left a lasting legacy that we still benefit from and this is a great opportunity to preserve the site. The vast majority of these camps were either torn down or burnt to the ground. Those that had a pre-fab style were disassembled and removed from their sites after the depression. This camp is so rare, it speaks volumes about this country's history. It should be saved." Thirteen of the original 25 buildings remain, including the mess hall, five barracks, three officers' quarters, the recreation hall, the hospital, the laundry building, and the education building.

== Historic status ==
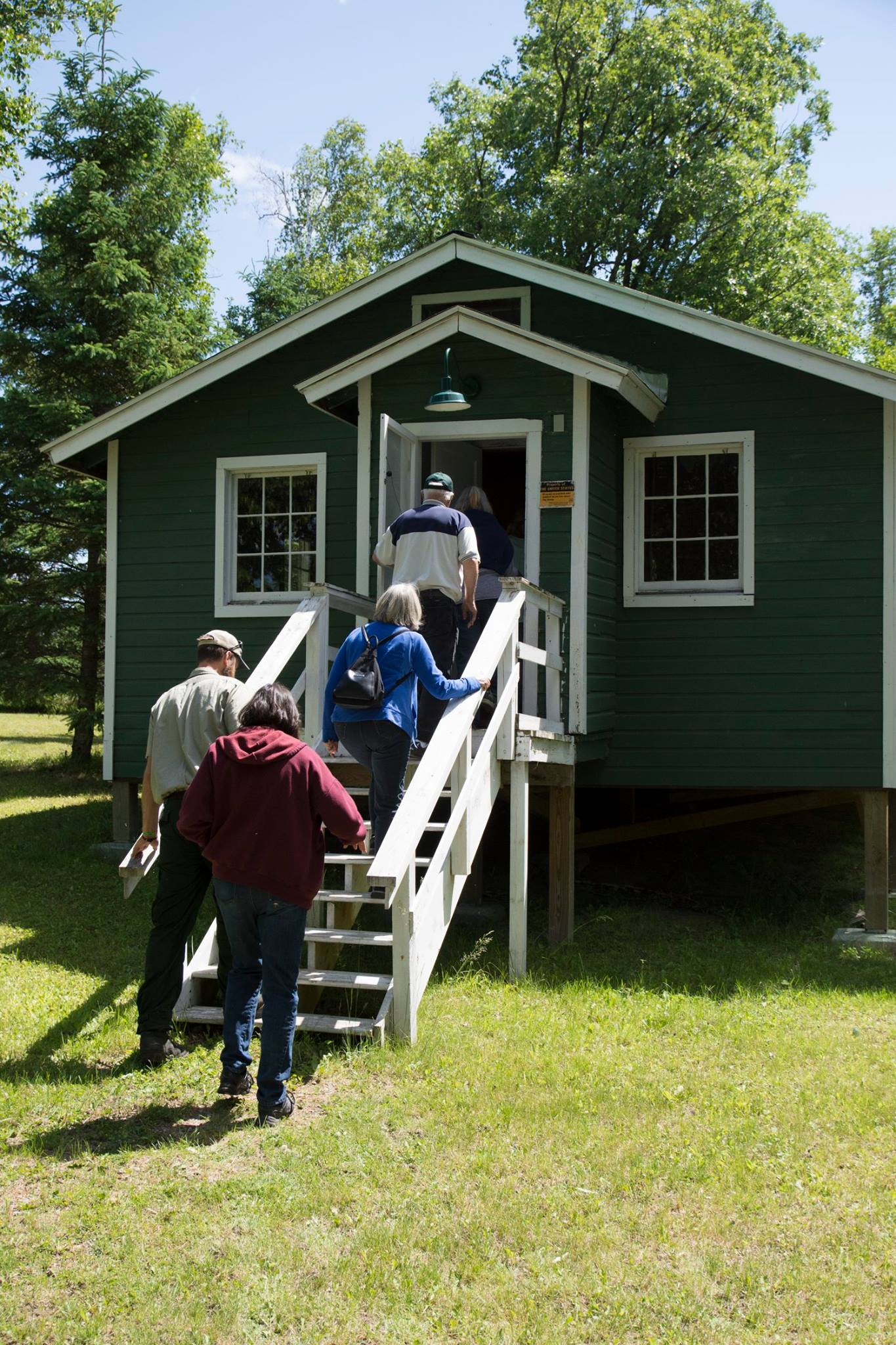
The National Forest offers guided and self-guided tours of the property

In 1999, the United States Forest Service began a three-year effort to stabilize and restore the Education Building. A contractor placed a foundation under the building, replaced the roof, and repaired some floors and siding. Throughout the next two years, a staff of 26 volunteers from the Forest Service's Passport in Time program spent nearly 1000 hours with general interior repairs.

The camp was designated a National Historic Landmark on February 17, 2006, as one of the best surviving examples of a CCC camp focusing on forest management and conservation.

== Repurposing ==
The camp was recently repurposed as the Rabideau Conservation Academy and Learning Center, a year-round learning center for children and young adults from Cass County and Beltrami County. The project was sponsored by the Leech Lake Band of Ojibwe to provide learning opportunities, bolster self-confidence, and provide a path to jobs and higher education.

== See also ==
- List of National Historic Landmarks in Minnesota
- National Register of Historic Places listings in Beltrami County, Minnesota
