= Minnesota State Highway 38 =

State highway in Minnesota, United States

Trunk Highway 38
- MN 38 highlighted in red

Route information
- Maintained by MnDOT
- Length: 46.766 mi (75.263 km)
- Existed: 1933–present
- Tourist routes: Edge of the Wilderness

Major junctions
- South end: US 2 in Grand Rapids
- MN 286 at Marcell
- North end: MN 1 in Effie

Location
- Country: United States
- State: Minnesota
- Counties: Itasca

Highway system
- Minnesota Trunk Highway System; Interstate; US; State; Legislative; Scenic
| ← MN 37 | → MN 39 |

Minnesota State Highway 38 (MN 38) is a 46.766-mile-long (75.263 km) highway in north-central Minnesota, which runs from its intersection with U.S. Highway 2 in Grand Rapids and continues north to its northern terminus at its intersection with State Highway 1 in Effie.

The entire length of Highway 38 has been designated a National Scenic Byway under the name Edge of the Wilderness. It is also sometimes called the Northwoods Highway.

== Route description ==
State Highway 38 serves as a north–south route between Grand Rapids and Effie in north-central Minnesota. The route is noted for being a twisty roadway.

The route passes through many lake resort areas, such as Wabana Lake, Trout Lake, and others.

Highway 38 passes through the Chippewa National Forest between Itasca County Road 19 and Bigfork.

Scenic State Park is located 7 miles east of the junction of Highway 38 and County Road 7 at Bigfork. The park entrance is located on County Road 7.

Highway 38 parallels State Highway 6 throughout its route.

== History ==
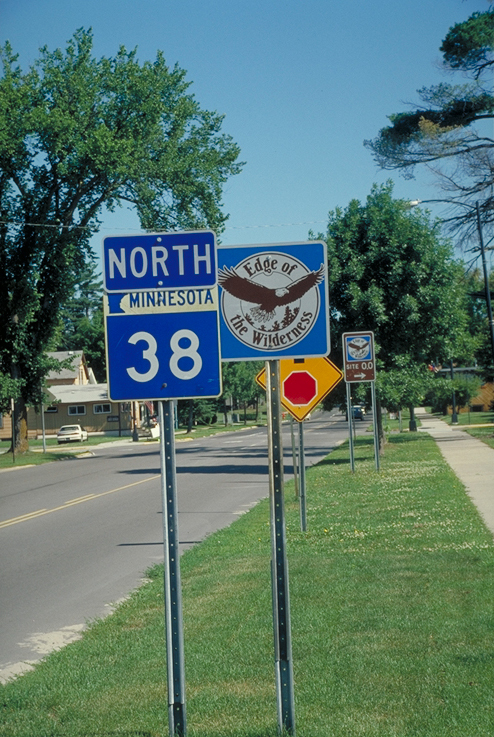
Edge of the Wilderness route markers.

State Highway 38 was authorized in 1933.

The route was completely paved by 1940.

== Major intersections ==
The entire route is in Itasca County.

| Location | mi | km | Destinations | Notes |
|---|---|---|---|---|
| Grand Rapids | 0.000 | 0.000 | US 2 – Duluth, Bemidji | |
| Marcell | 28.493 | 45.855 | MN 286 west – Talmoon | |
| Effie | 46.858 | 75.411 | MN 1 – Cook, Northome CSAH 5 north | Roadway continues as CSAH 5 north |
1.000 mi = 1.609 km; 1.000 km = 0.621 mi
