= Minneapolis and Rainy River Railway =

Overview
- Headquarters: Deer River, MN
- Locale: Minnesota
- Dates of operation: 1901–1932

Technical
- Track gauge: 4 ft 8 1/2 in (1,435 mm) standard gauge

The Minneapolis and Rainy River Railway was a 97 miles (156 km) long American short line railroad used primarily for logging activities in northern Minnesota in the early 20th century. It was incorporated on July 20, 1901 and was owned by the Itasca Lumber Company. Less than two weeks after its inception, the railway purchased the property of the Itasca Railroad.

The 1916 Railroad Commissioners Map of Minnesota listed 87.71 miles of track.

Due to the abundance of liver sausage in the logging camps along the line, it was nicknamed the "Gut and Liver Line." Despite its name, the Minneapolis and Rainy River Railway never got within 200 miles of Minneapolis nor within 75 miles of the Rainy River.

Faced with the dramatic reduction of logging activities and the effects of the Great Depression, the railway reduced its services and ultimately abandoned its activities in 1932.
