= Big Fork State Forest =

State forest in Minnesota, United States

- Location within Minnesota
- Interactive map of Big Fork State Forest

Geography
- Location: Koochiching and Itasca counties, Minnesota, United States
- Coordinates: 47°28′30″N 93°33′47″W
- Area: 127,929 acres (51,771 ha)

Administration
- Established: 1963
- Authority: Minnesota Department of Natural Resources,
- Website: www.dnr.state.mn.us/state_forests/sft00006/index.html

Ecology
- WWF Classification: Western Great Lakes Forests
- EPA Classification: Northern Lakes and Forests

The Big Fork State Forest is a state forest located in Koochiching and Itasca counties, Minnesota. It is primarily managed by the Minnesota Department of Natural Resources. The landscape has many moraines, lakes, and wetlands. The "Lost 40" and the largest red pine in the state of Minnesota are located within the forest.

Outdoor recreation activities include hiking, mountain biking, and cross-country skiing on provided trails, as well as backcountry camping, swimming, fishing. There is boat, canoe, and kayak access to the Big Fork River which runs through a portion of the forest, with Class I, III, IV, and V rapids located downstream.

== See also ==
- List of Minnesota state forests
