= Chippewa National Forest =

National Forest in Minnesota, United States

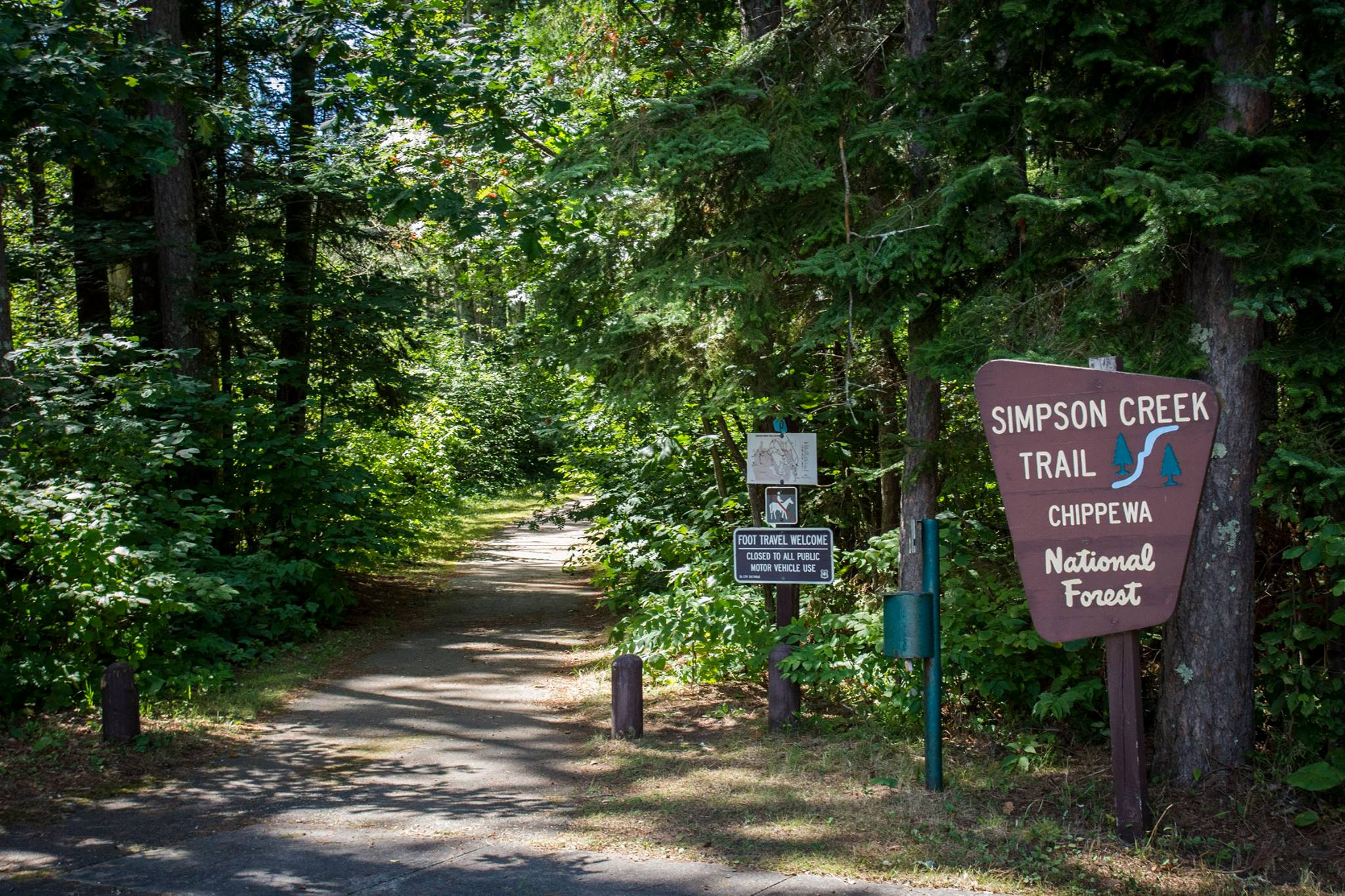

- Location within the United States
- Location: Itasca / Cass / Beltrami counties, Minnesota, United States
- Nearest city: Cass Lake, MN
- Coordinates: 47°20′26″N 94°12′24″W
- Area: 666,623 acres (2,697.73 km^{2})
- Established: 1908
- Governing body: U.S. Forest Service
- Website: Chippewa National Forest

Chippewa National Forest is a national forest located in north central Minnesota, United States, in the counties of Itasca, Cass and Beltrami. Forest headquarters are located in Cass Lake, Minnesota. There are local ranger district offices in Blackduck, Deer River and Walker.

== History ==
The Forest was established as the Minnesota Forest Reserve on 27 June 1902, with the passage of the Morris Act. While this act mainly addressed the disposition of unallotted lands on Ojibwe Indian reservations in Minnesota, 200,000 acres (810 km^{2}) of the Chippewas of the Mississippi, Cass Lake, Leech Lake, and Winnibigoshish Indian reservations were designated as a Forest Reserve.

Led by Maria Sanford and Florence Bramhall of the Federation of Minnesota Women's Clubs, conservation activism beginning in 1900 brought the forest and potential threats to wide public attention. The Reserve was re-established as the Minnesota National Forest on 23 May 1908. In 1928, the forest was renamed in honor of the Chippewa tribe of Native Americans from whose land the forest was created. Subsequent boundary expansions and land purchases increased the area of the forest to its present size.

=== The Lost Forty ===
The Forest contains an area known as the Lost Forty. This area, which has a total of 144 acres (0.58 km^{2}), was accidentally mapped as part of Coddington Lake when the original maps of the region were laid out in 1882. As a result of the mapping error, the Lost Forty was never logged. It contains some of the state's oldest forests, with trees over 350 years old. Today, less than two percent of Minnesota's total forested land is such old growth forest.

=== Historic and cultural sites ===
There are over 3000 archeological and historic sites located within the forest, two that are most notable and open to the public are:

- Camp Rabideau a Civilian Conservation Corps (CCC) camp is one of the best-preserved of the nation's many CCC camps.
- The Chippewa National Forest Historic Supervisor's Office, constructed by the Civilian Conservation Corps and Works Project Administration.
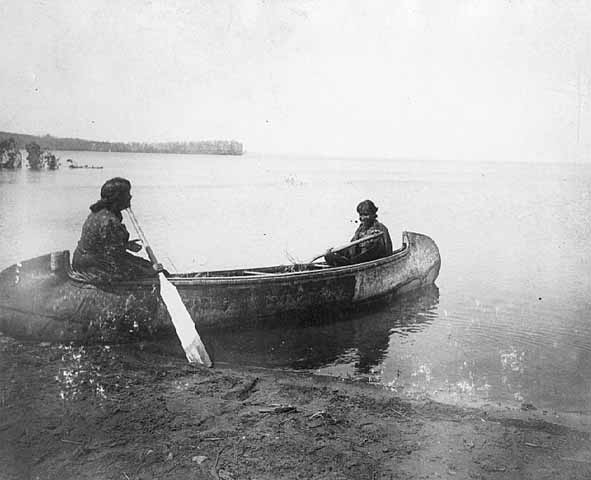
Ojibwa women in canoe, Leech Lake

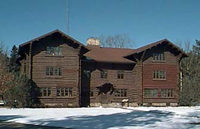
Forest Supervisor's Office, built in 1936

== Geography ==
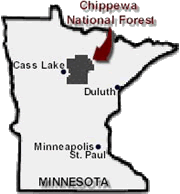
Location of Chippewa National Forest

The forest covers 667,094 acres (2,699.63 km^{2}). Water is abundant, with over 1,300 lakes, 923 miles (1,485 km) of rivers and streams and 400,000 acres (1,600 km^{2}) of wetlands. The Forest has more lakes and wetlands than any other National Forest in the nation, boasting approximately 13% of all surface water within the entire National Forest system. Inside the forest the Cut Foot Sioux Trail runs along the Laurentian Divide.

Three of the top ten largest lakes in size within the State of Minnesota are located within the forest, these are Cass Lake, Leech Lake and Lake Winnibigoshish. Approximately 44% of the Forest's land is within the Leech Lake Indian Reservation.

== Fauna and flora ==
Aspen, birch, pine, balsam fir, and maple blanket the forest. Old growth forest such as the Lost Forty section of the CNF is valuable for wildlife, including bald eagle, several species of hawk and woodpecker, red squirrel, weasel, and numerous other species. In the 1960s, the bald eagle population in the forest was only 12 nesting pairs. Since then the population has rebounded. The bald eagle population of the Chippewa National Forest is one of the highest densities in the lower 48 states at 150 nesting pairs.

== Recreation ==
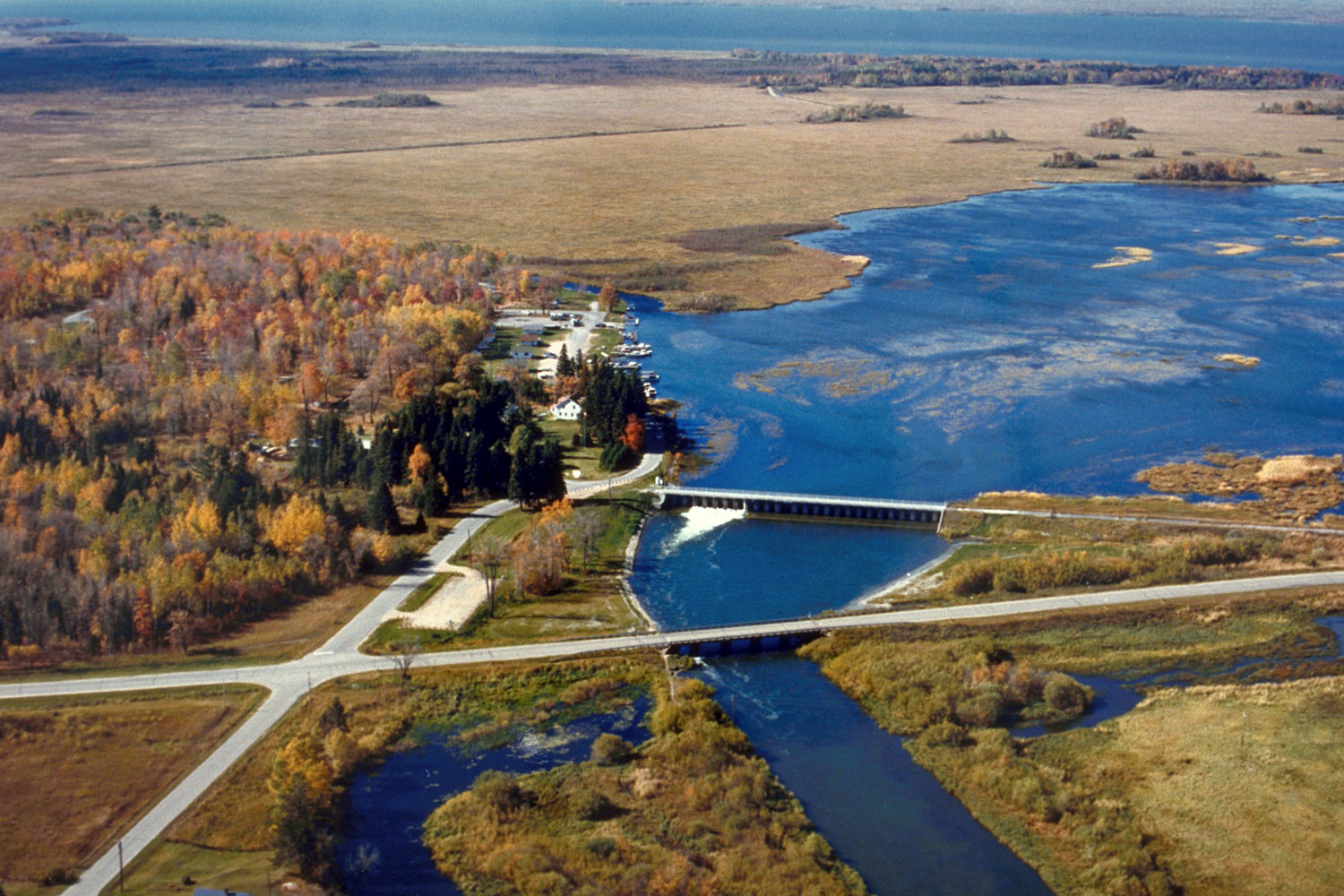
Leech Lake Dam at Leech Lake near the town of Federal Dam

The Forest contains 21 developed campgrounds, 41 miles of paved bike trails, 43 miles of unpaved bike trails, 160 miles of hiking trails, 298 miles of non-motorized trails, 380 miles of snowmobile trails, 68 dispersed camping locations, 20 miles of horse trails, 83 boat accesses.

A highlight of the Forest's trail system is the 60-plus mile segment of the North Country National Scenic Trail that parallels State Highways 34 and 200 and features backpacking campsites along its route. Find an interactive map of the Trail's route at the North Country Trail Association's website.

=== Visitor Centers ===
The Forest operates three visitor centers in the forest, they are:

- Cut Foot Sioux Visitor Center – near Deer River, open Memorial Day weekend through Labor Day weekend.
- Edge of the Wilderness Discovery Center – near Marcell, open year-round.
- Norway Beach Visitor Center – near Cass Lake, open Memorial Day weekend through Labor Day weekend.

=== Scenic Byways ===
Many roadways, including U.S. and State Highways and county roads, intersect the forest for easy access to the forest. Within the Forest are five scenic byways for scenic drives for visitors that intersect through the forest.

- Great River Road, follows the Mississippi River within the Forest
- Edge of the Wilderness National Scenic Byway
- Avenue of the Pines National Forest Scenic Byway
- Lake Country Scenic Byway
- Lady Slipper Scenic Byway, named for the Minnesota State Flower Pink-and-white Lady's-slipper, which can be found in the Forest.

== See also ==
- Superior National Forest
- List of Minnesota trees
- List of national forests of the United States
- Lost 40
