= Effie, Minnesota =

City in Minnesota, United States

- City
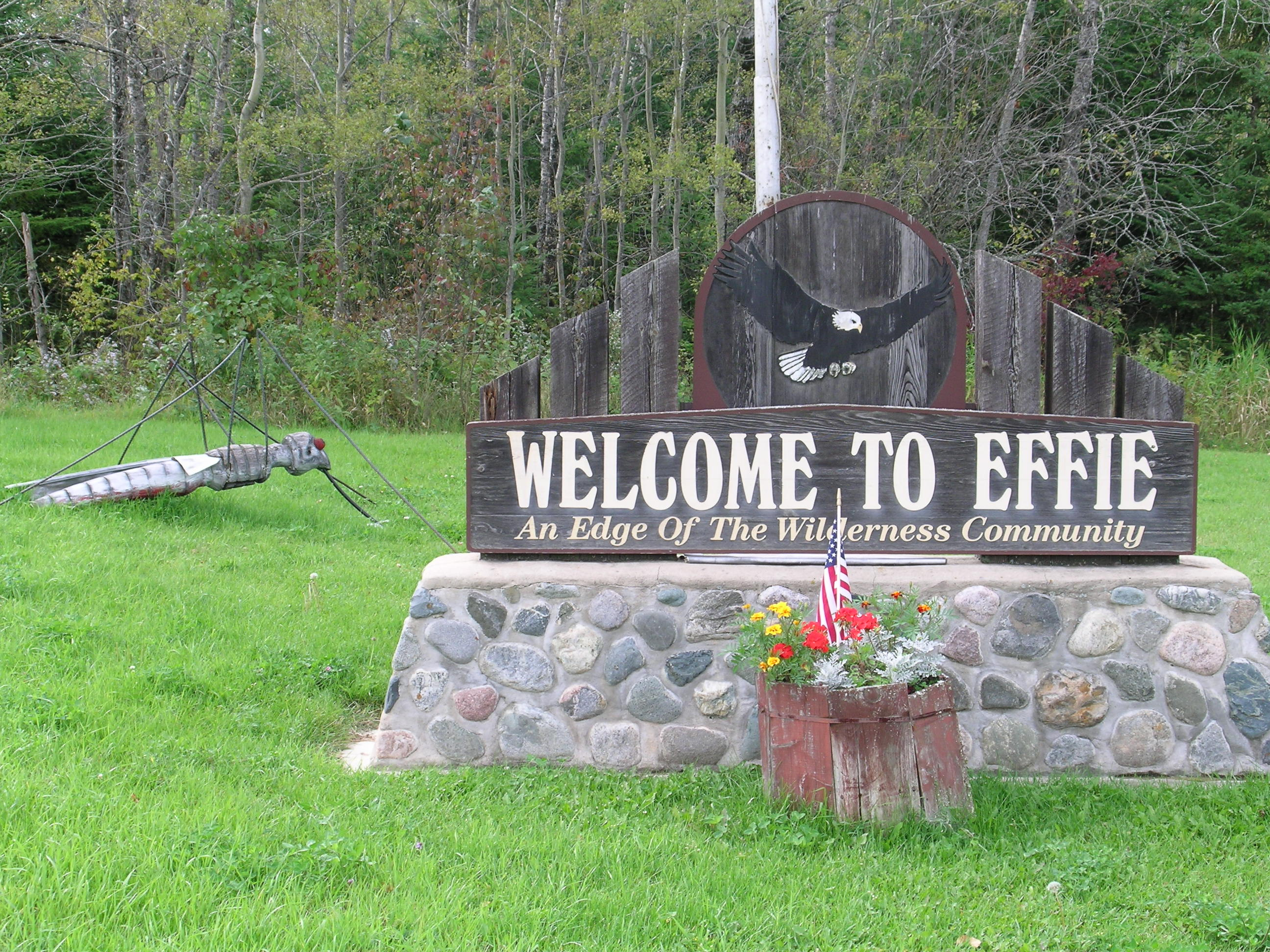
- Giant mosquito (and welcome sign) welcomes travelers to Effie

- Location of the city of Effie within Itasca County, Minnesota
- Coordinates: 47°50′26″N 93°38′17″W
- Country: United States
- State: Minnesota
- County: Itasca
- Incorporated: June 10, 1940

Government
  - Mayor: Greta Drewlow

Area
  - Total: 3.662 sq mi (9.485 km^{2})
  - Land: 3.662 sq mi (9.485 km^{2})
  - Water: 0 sq mi (0.000 km^{2})
- Elevation: 1,388 ft (423 m)

Population (2020)
  - Total: 109
  - Estimate (2022): 108
  - Density: 29.8/sq mi (11.49/km^{2})
- Time zone: UTC−6 (Central (CST))
  - Summer (DST): UTC−5 (CDT)
- ZIP Code: 56639
- Area code: 218
- FIPS code: 27-18260
- GNIS feature ID: 0656123
- Sales tax: 7.875%

Effie (/ˈɛfi/ EF-ee) is a city in Itasca County, Minnesota, United States. The population was 109 at the 2020 census.

Minnesota State Highways 1 and 38 are two of the main routes in the community.

== History ==
A post office was established in Effie in 1903. The community was named after Effie Wenaus, the daughter of the city's first postmaster.

== Geography ==
According to the United States Census Bureau, the city has an area of 3.662 square miles (9.48 km^{2}), all land.

== Demographics ==
Historical population
Census	Pop.	Note	%±
1950	202		—
1960	195		−3.5%
1970	165		−15.4%
1980	141		−14.5%
1990	130		−7.8%
2000	91		−30.0%
2010	123		35.2%
2020	109		−11.4%
2022 (est.)	108		−0.9%
U.S. Decennial Census; 2020 Census

=== 2010 census ===
As of the 2010 census, there were 123 people, 48 households, and 29 families living in the city. The population density was 33.8 inhabitants per square mile (13.1/km^{2}). There were 68 housing units at an average density of 18.7 per square mile (7.2/km^{2}). The racial makeup of the city was 95.9% White, 0.8% African American, 1.6% Asian, and 1.6% from two or more races.

There were 48 households, of which 31.3% had children under the age of 18 living with them, 47.9% were married couples living together, 8.3% had a female householder with no husband present, 4.2% had a male householder with no wife present, and 39.6% were non-families. 31.3% of all households were made up of individuals, and 12.5% had someone living alone who was 65 years of age or older. The average household size was 2.56 and the average family size was 3.24.

The median age in the city was 32.8 years. 26.8% of residents were under the age of 18; 8.9% were between the ages of 18 and 24; 26.8% were from 25 to 44; 22.7% were from 45 to 64; and 14.6% were 65 years of age or older. The gender makeup of the city was 51.2% male and 48.8% female.

=== 2000 census ===
As of the 2000 census, there were 91 people, 36 households, and 24 families living in the city. The population density was 22.8 inhabitants per square mile (8.8/km^{2}). There were 56 housing units at an average density of 14.0 per square mile (5.4/km^{2}). The racial makeup of the city was 97.80% White and 2.20% Asian. Hispanic or Latino of any race were 1.10% of the population.

There were 36 households, out of which 27.8% had children under the age of 18 living with them, 61.1% were married couples living together, 2.8% had a female householder with no husband present, and 33.3% were non-families. 30.6% of all households were made up of individuals, and 13.9% had someone living alone who was 65 years of age or older. The average household size was 2.53 and the average family size was 3.25.

In the city, the population was spread out, with 28.6% under the age of 18, 7.7% from 18 to 24, 25.3% from 25 to 44, 20.9% from 45 to 64, and 17.6% who were 65 years of age or older. The median age was 37 years. For every 100 females, there were 122.0 males. For every 100 females age 18 and over, there were 116.7 males.

The median income for a household in the city was $31,250, and the median income for a family was $29,583. Males had a median income of $21,250 versus $21,875 for females. The per capita income for the city was $14,606. There were 7.4% of families and 5.2% of the population living below the poverty line, including no under eighteens and 18.5% of those over 64.

== Events ==
Effie is home to The Effie North Star Stampede. The annual rodeo is held on the last weekend in July.
