= Deer River, Minnesota =

City in Minnesota, United States

Deer River Waawaashkeshiwi-ziibiing (Ojibwe)
- City
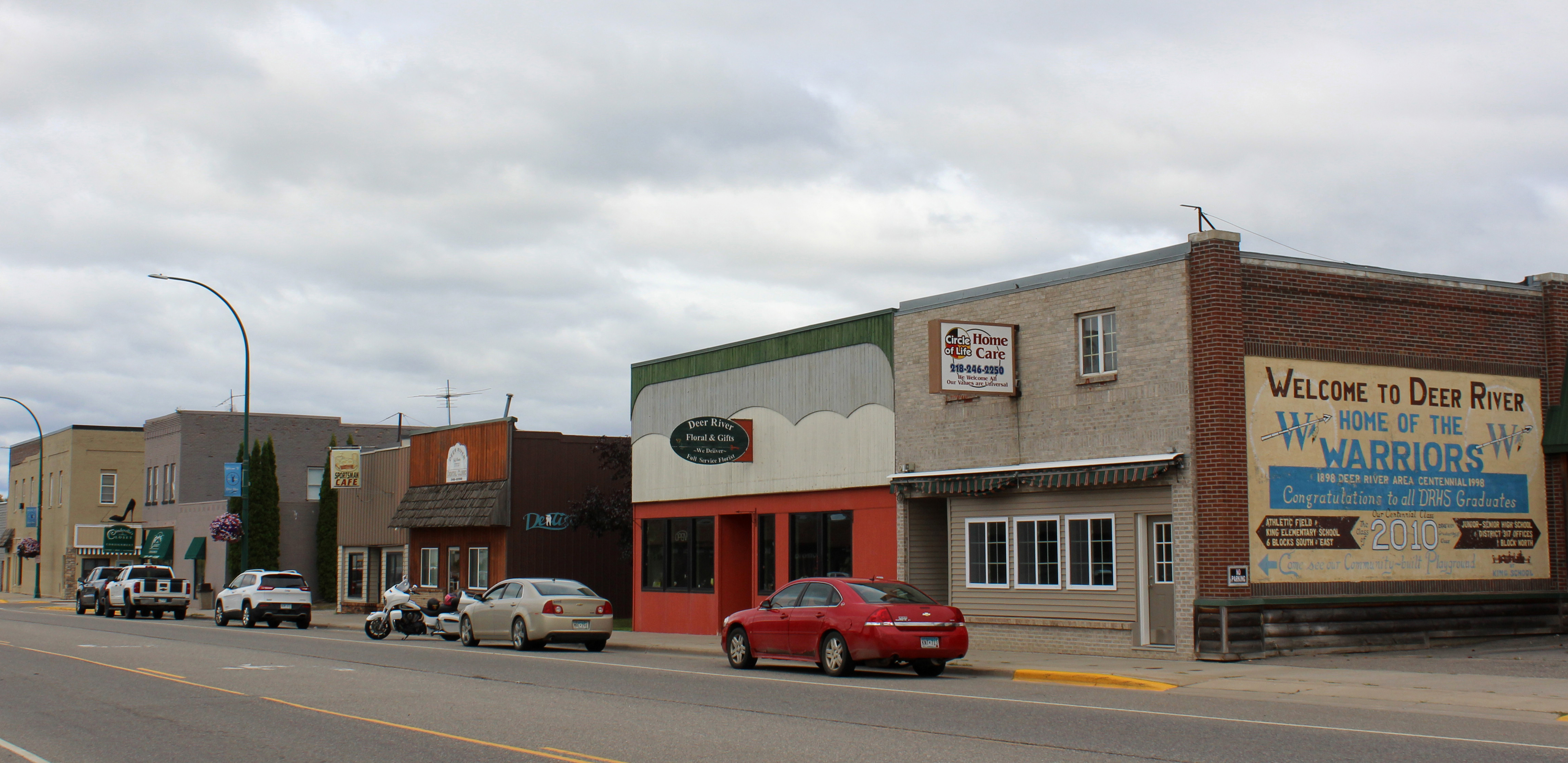
- Commercial businesses on Great River Rd

- Location of the city of Deer River within Itasca County, Minnesota
- Coordinates: 47°20′6″N 93°47′39″W
- Country: United States
- State: Minnesota
- County: Itasca
- Incorporated: January 22, 1898

Government
  - Mayor: Steven R. Geving

Area
  - Total: 1.51 sq mi (3.91 km^{2})
  - Land: 1.51 sq mi (3.91 km^{2})
  - Water: 0 sq mi (0.00 km^{2})
- Elevation: 1,293 ft (394 m)

Population (2020)
  - Total: 909
  - Estimate (2022): 903
  - Density: 602.5/sq mi (232.62/km^{2})
- Time zone: UTC-6 (Central (CST))
  - Summer (DST): UTC-5 (CDT)
- ZIP code: 56636
- Area code: 218
- FIPS code: 27-15310
- GNIS feature ID: 0655967
- Website: deerrivercity.com

Deer River (Ojibwe: Waawaashkeshiwi-ziibiing) is a city in Itasca County, Minnesota, United States. The population was 909 at the 2020 census.

U.S. Highway 2 and Minnesota State Highways 6 and 46 are three of the main routes in the community.

== History ==
Until 2011, Deer River had a site on the National Register of Historic Places, the Itasca Lumber Company Superintendent's House, built in 1904 by the area's leading lumber company.

Late in World War II, a logging camp manned by prisoners of war was at the site of an old CCC camp near Deer River.

== Geography ==
According to the United States Census Bureau, the city has an area of 1.29 square miles (3.34 km^{2}), all land.

== Demographics ==
Historical population
Census	Pop.	Note	%±
1900	251		—
1910	900		258.6%
1920	1,044		16.0%
1930	832		−20.3%
1940	987		18.6%
1950	1,033		4.7%
1960	992		−4.0%
1970	815		−17.8%
1980	907		11.3%
1990	838		−7.6%
2000	903		7.8%
2010	930		3.0%
2020	909		−2.3%
2022 (est.)	903		−0.7%
U.S. Decennial Census; 2020 Census

=== 2010 census ===
As of the census of 2010, there were 930 people, 397 households, and 212 families living in the city. The population density was 720.9 inhabitants per square mile (278.3/km^{2}). There were 434 housing units at an average density of 336.4 per square mile (129.9/km^{2}). The racial makeup of the city was 83.8% White, 0.1% African American, 11.5% Native American, 0.1% from other races, and 4.5% from two or more races. Hispanic or Latino of any race were 0.3% of the population.

There were 397 households, of which 28.2% had children under the age of 18 living with them, 37.5% were married couples living together, 10.8% had a female householder with no husband present, 5.0% had a male householder with no wife present, and 46.6% were non-families. 39.8% of all households were made up of individuals, and 19.4% had someone living alone who was 65 years of age or older. The average household size was 2.25 and the average family size was 3.05.

The median age in the city was 39.8 years. 24.6% of residents were under the age of 18; 9% were between the ages of 18 and 24; 20.8% were from 25 to 44; 24% were from 45 to 64; and 21.6% were 65 years of age or older. The gender makeup of the city was 44.9% male and 55.1% female.

=== 2000 census ===
As of the census of 2000, there were 903 people, 389 households, and 220 families living in the city. The population density was 850.9 inhabitants per square mile (328.5/km^{2}). There were 415 housing units at an average density of 391.1 per square mile (151.0/km^{2}). The racial makeup of the city was 84.05% White, 12.07% Native American, 0.22% Asian, and 3.65% from two or more races. Hispanic or Latino of any race were 0.66% of the population. 21.6% were of German, 14.8% Norwegian, 11.7% Finnish and 7.1% Swedish ancestry according to Census 2000.

There were 389 households, out of which 27.2% had children under the age of 18 living with them, 41.9% were married couples living together, 10.3% had a female householder with no husband present, and 43.2% were non-families. 39.3% of all households were made up of individuals, and 24.7% had someone living alone who was 65 years of age or older. The average household size was 2.19 and the average family size was 2.94.

In the city, the population was spread out, with 24.4% under the age of 18, 8.3% from 18 to 24, 23.3% from 25 to 44, 17.7% from 45 to 64, and 26.4% who were 65 years of age or older. The median age was 41 years. For every 100 females, there were 80.6 males. For every 100 females age 18 and over, there were 77.9 males.

The median income for a household in the city was $21,900, and the median income for a family was $32,273. Males had a median income of $29,063 versus $15,156 for females. The per capita income for the city was $13,078. About 10.3% of families and 17.3% of the population were below the poverty line, including 19.6% of those under age 18 and 21.7% of those age 65 or over.

== Gallery ==
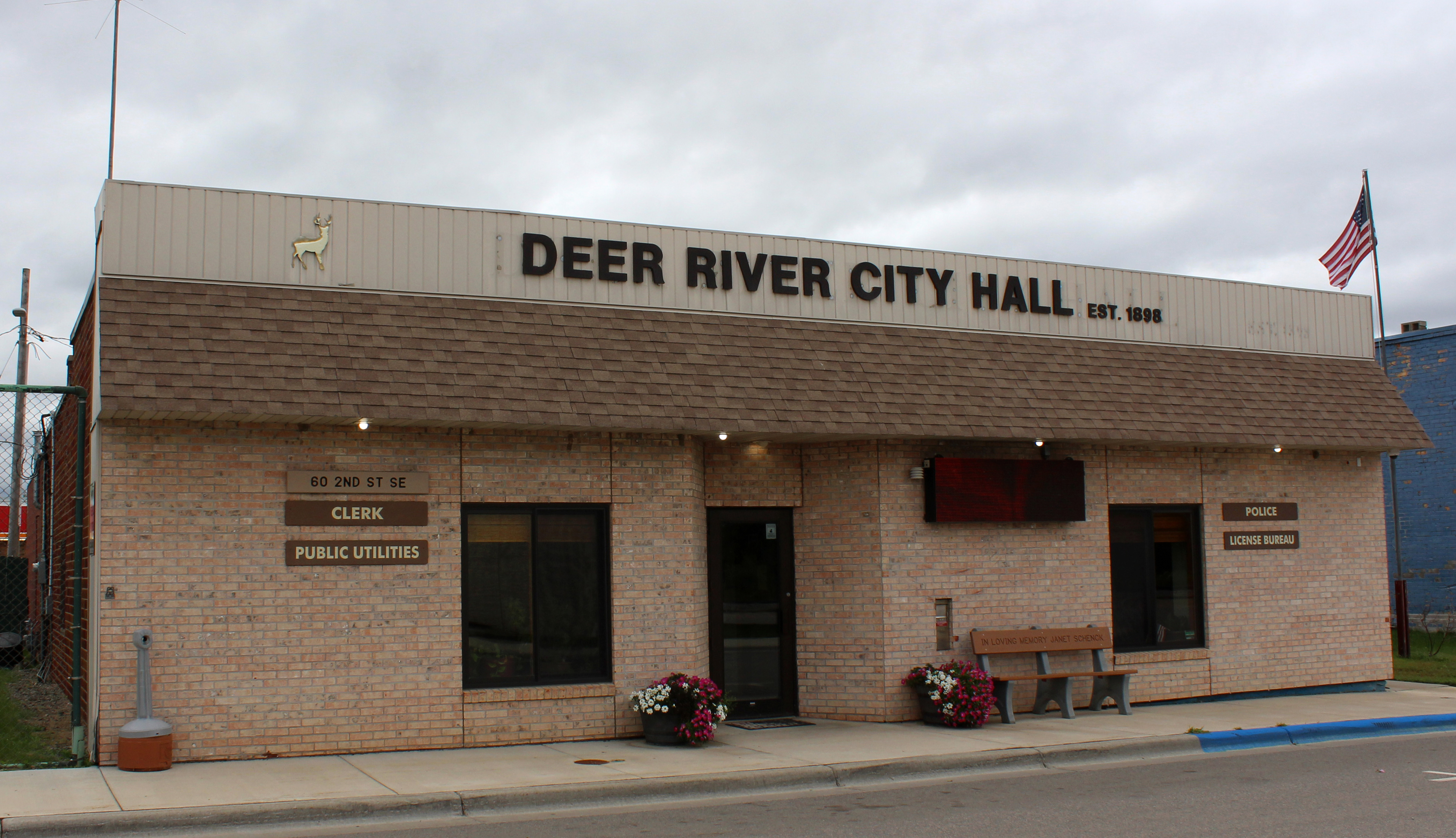
City Hall

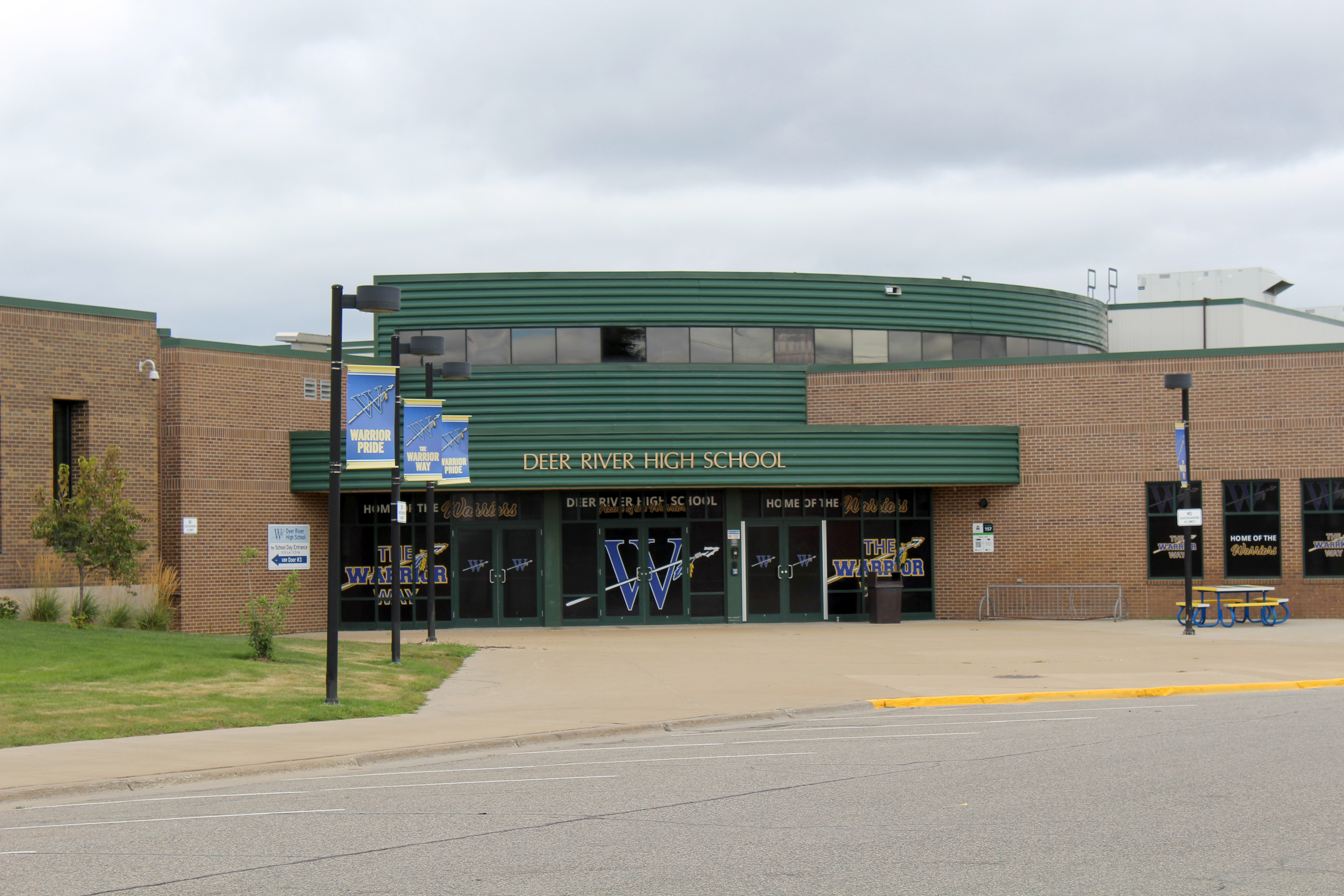
Deer River High School

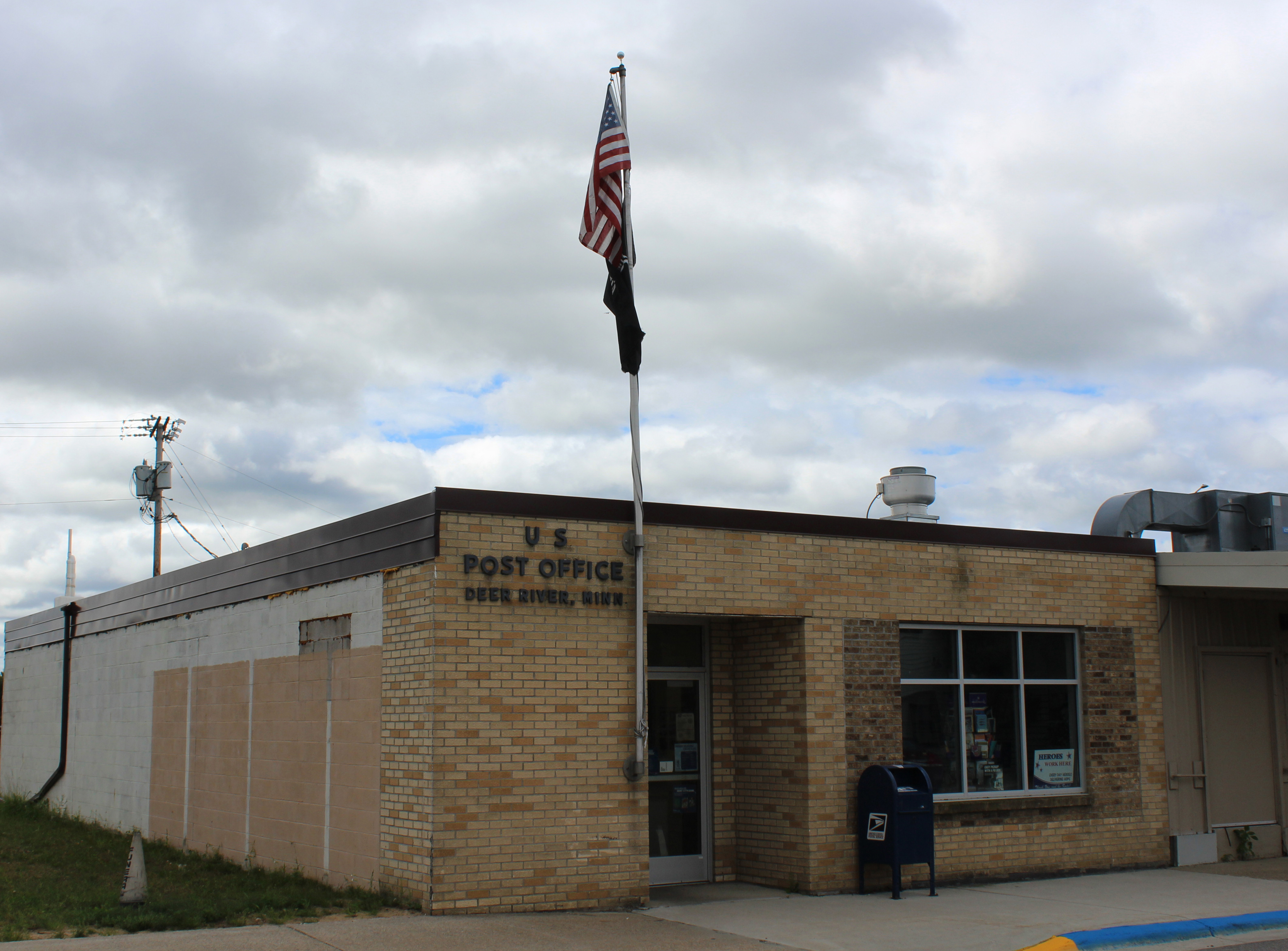
Post office

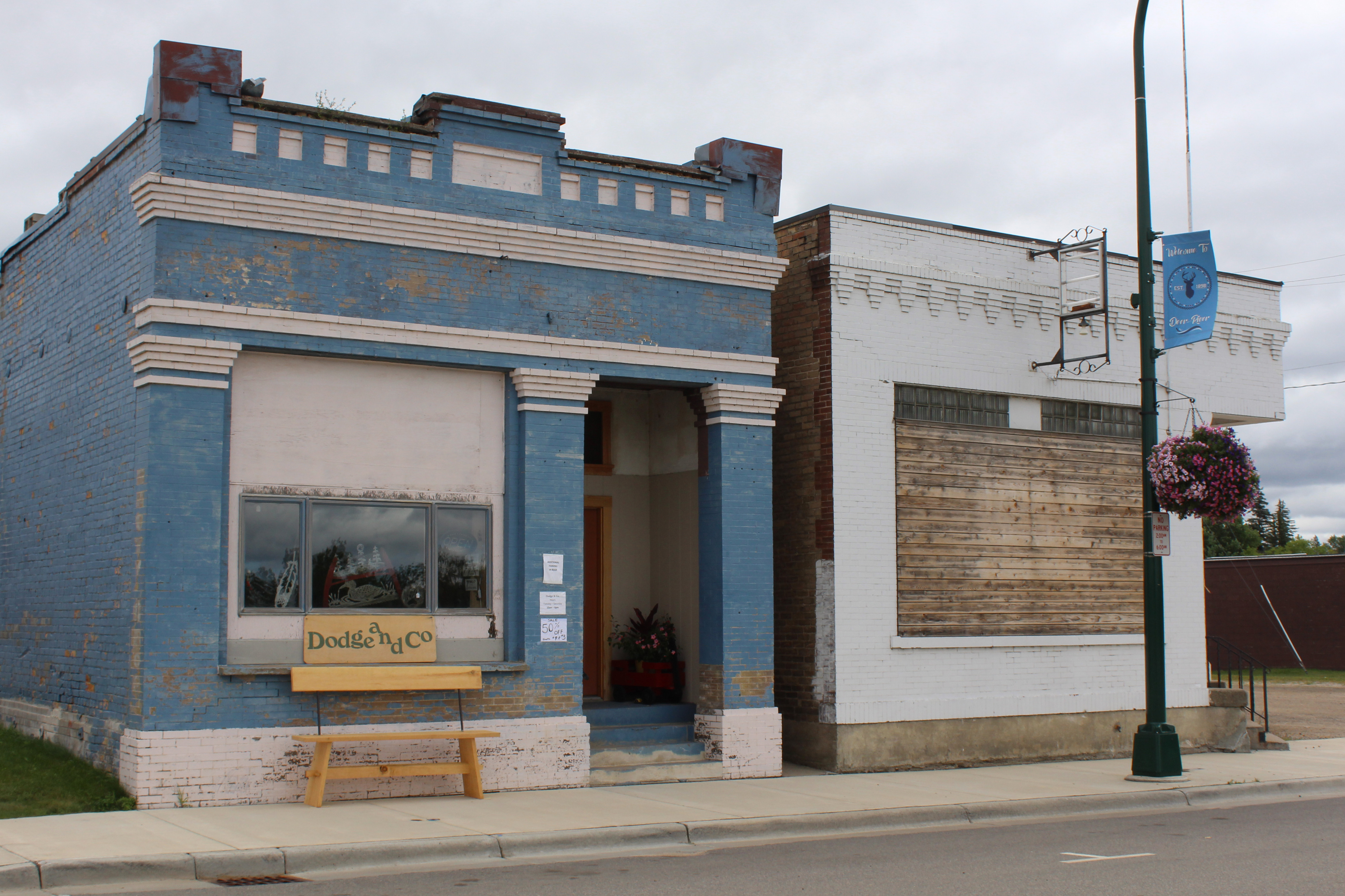
Commercial storefronts

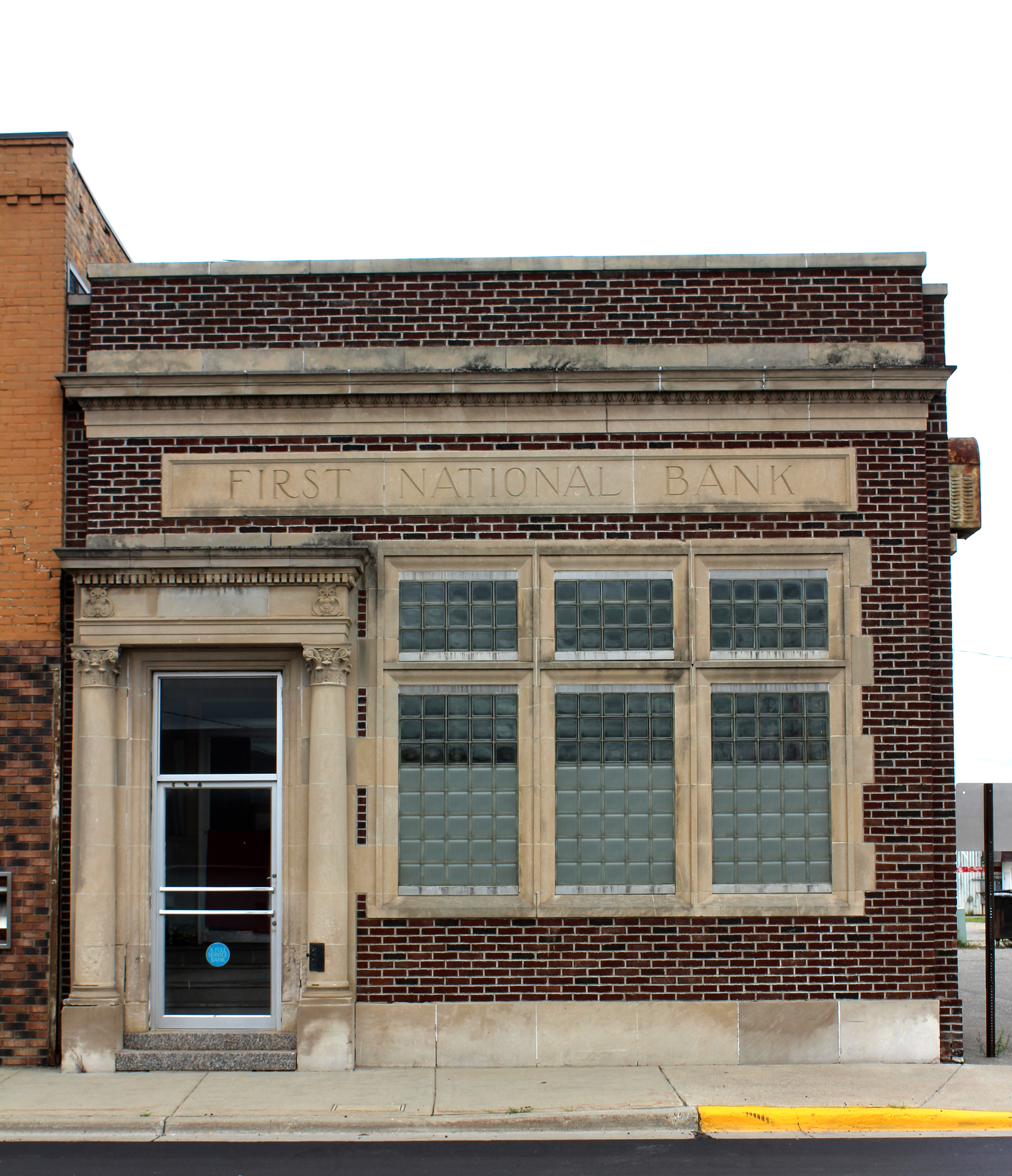
First National Bank building
