= Wirth =

Wirth is a German surname which may refer to any of the following individuals:

== Business, politics, and military ==
- Andrew Wirth (born 1963), American businessman
- Christian Wirth (1885–1944), German Nazi SS extermination camp commander
- Christian Wirth (politician) (born 1963), German politician
- Conrad L. Wirth (1899–1993), American administrator
- Gerd Wirth (1951–2025), German politician
- John L. Wirth (1917–1945), American Naval officer
- Joseph Wirth (1879–1956), German politician, Chancellor and Finance Minister
- Kelley Wirth, American politician
- Theodore Wirth (1863–1949), Swiss-American horticulturalist
- Tim Wirth (born 1939), American politician
- Zachary Wirth, American politician

== Arts, media and television ==
- Ann Fisher-Wirth (born 1947), American poet and university professor
- Billy Wirth (born 1962), American actor
- Dawn Wirth (born 1960), American photographer
- Emanuel Wirth (1842–1923), German violinist
- Franz Peter Wirth (1919–1999), German film director and screenwriter
- George Wirth (born 1947), American singer-songwriter
- Hana Wirth-Nesher (born 1948), Israeli literary scholar and university professor
- Herman Wirth (1885–1981), Dutch-German historian
- RaD Man (born Christian Wirth), computer art historian
- Iwan Wirth (born 1970), Swiss art dealer
- James Jeffrey Wirth (born 1990), American drag queen
- Manuela Wirth (born c. 1960s), Swiss art dealer
- Max Wirth (1822–1900), German journalist and economist
- May Wirth (1894–1978), Australian circus and vaudeville performer
- Philip Wirth (1864–1937), Australian circus proprietor

== Sports ==
- Alan Wirth (born 1956), American baseball player
- Andreas Wirth (born 1984), German racing driver
- Christina Wirth (born 1987), American basketball player
- Derek Wirth (born 1978), Australian football player
- Enrique Wirth (born 1925), Argentine athlete
- Günther Wirth (1933–2020), German football player
- Janina Wirth (born 1966), German figure skater
- Karl-Heinz Wirth (born 1944), German football player
- Nolan Wirth (born 1995), Canadian soccer player
- Orlando Wirth (born 1981), Dutch footballer
- Oscar Wirth (born 1955), Chilean football player
- Patrick Wirth (born 1971), Austrian skier
- Rainer Wirth (born 1982), Chilean football player
- Senaida Wirth (1926–1967), American baseball player
- Siegbert Wirth (1929–1999), American soccer player

== Science and engineering ==
- Dyann Wirth (born 1951), American immunologist
- Wilhelm Wirth (1876–1952), German psychologist
- Willis Wagner Wirth (1916–1994), American entomologist
- Niklaus Wirth (1934–2024), Swiss computer scientist, designer of several programming languages
- Hugh Wirth (1939–2018), Australian veterinarian
- Nick Wirth (born 1966), British automotive engineer

== Other ==
- James Wirth (1830–1871), German Catholic religious brother
- John Wirth (historian) (1936–2002), American historian
- Louis Wirth (1897–1952), American sociologist
- Oswald Wirth (1860–1943), Swiss tarot writer and occultist
- Theodore Wirth (1863–1949), Swiss-born, horticulturalist, architect of Minneapolis park system

== See also ==
- Jacob Wirth Restaurant, a German-American restaurant and bar in Boston, Massachusetts
- Wirths (surname)
- Wirth Lake (disambiguation)
- Wirt (disambiguation)
