= Philip St. Leon =

Australian circus performer (1890–1958)

- Born: Philip Vincent St. Leon; 1890; Melbourne, Victoria, Australia
- Died: 23 June 1958 (age 69); Meriden, Connecticut, U.S.
- Other names: Phil Wirth
- Occupations: Circus performer; circus proprietor
- Parent: Gus St. Leon

Philip St. Leon (1890 – 23 June 1958), known by the stage name Phil Wirth, was an Australian circus and vaudeville performer. He was associated with the St. Leon and Wirth circus families.

== Early life ==
Philip Vincent St. Leon was born in Melbourne, Australia, in 1890.

His father was Gus St. Leon. He grew up in a circus family and was a member of the St. Leon Circus troupe at a young age.

== Career ==
During the 1902 and 1903 seasons, he was part of the Gus St. Leon troupe with the Ringling Brothers Circus.

Phil was a comic circus horseback rider. He first joined the May Wirth equestrian troupe in Australia. He adopted the stage name of Phil Wirth for professional purposes after joining the Wirth's Circus.

He moved to the United States in 1916 to appear with the May Wirth troupe of the Ringling Bros. and Barnum & Bailey Circus. He spent 11 years as a featured rider in the show.

In 1917, he married Stella Wirth, who was part of the troupe. His wife, Stella, was a niece of the original Wirth Brothers. They made their home in Riverdale, Bronx.

The troupe later shifted to touring as a vaudeville act. Their tour began in 1927 and brought them worldwide.

He stopped performing as a rider in 1937. That year, he joined the three-ring Hunt Bros. Circus. Known as Phil Wirth of the May Wirth troupe, he served as the ringmaster and equestrian director from 1937 to the mid-1950s. His wife was an organist for the Hunt Bros. band.

== Death ==
Philip St. Leon died on 23 June 1958 in Meriden, Connecticut, United States, at age 69.

His death was from a heart attack in his bed at the Hunt Bros. Circus grounds at Meriden's Hanover Park.

== Legacy ==
Phil St. Leon spent 30 years with the Hunt Bros. Circus. Harry T. Hunt, proprietor of the circus, considered him to be one of the finest performers in circus history.
