= Wirt =

Wirt may refer to:

== People ==
=== Wirt as surname ===
- Elizabeth Wirt (1784-1857), American author
- John S. Wirt (1851–1904), American politician and lawyer
- Václav Wirt (1893–1962), Czech gymnast
- Wigand Wirt (1460–1519), German theologian
- William Wirt (attorney general) (1772–1834), American author and statesman
- William Wirt (educator) (1874–1938), American educator

=== Wirt as given name ===
- Wirt Sikes (1836–1883), American journalist and writer
- William Wirt Winchester (1837–1881), American businessman
- Wirt Williams (1921–1986), American journalist, writer, and educator
- Wirt, a character from the Diablo video game
- Wirt, the main character from Over the Garden Wall

== Places ==
- Wirt, Indiana
- Wirt, New York
- Wirt, Minnesota
- Wirt Township, Itasca County, Minnesota
- Wirt County, West Virginia

== Other ==
- 2044 Wirt, an asteroid
- WIRT-DT, a U.S. television station

== See also ==
- Wirth
