= Gus St. Leon =

Australian circus proprietor (1848–1924)

- Born: Gus St. Leon c. 1848; Australia
- Died: 17 October 1924 (age 76); Junee, New South Wales, Australia
- Occupations: Circus performer; circus proprietor
- Children: 5, including Philip St. Leon
- Family: Walter St. Leon (brother); Alf St. Leon (brother)

Gus St. Leon (c. 1848 – 17 October 1924) was an Australian bareback rider and circus proprietor.

== Early life ==
Gus St. Leon was born in Australia in the 19th century. As the eldest son, he represented the second generation of the St. Leon circus family. His father had played cornet and drum outside a tent show in New South Wales in 1839, and Gus followed him into show business.

== Career ==
Gus St. Leon began performing with "St. Leon's Royal Palace Circus and Menagerie" in the early 1880s. The circus, owned by his father, established itself as one of Australia's major circuses. Gus and his brother Alf appeared in their father's circus as bareback riding stars billed as "the champion bareback riders of the world." Among his early acts, he portrayed English, Irish, and Scotch characters on horseback, appearing in three changes of costume. In the mid-1880s, he began to display his equestrian ability by skillfully handling seven bareback horses.

When his father's fortunes declined in the late 1880s, it allowed the Wirth Brothers to rise as proprietors of Australia's leading circus. By late 1889, Gus and his brother Alf were performing with the Wirth Brothers Circus. They joined the "Wirth Brothers' Colossal Combined Circus" for the 1890 season. Gus appeared in a three-horse horizontal bar routine with Alf and George Wirth and also rode in an "Indian American" act.

He made his U.S. debut in 1902, directing the St. Leon troupe during its season with the Ringling Brothers Circus. He returned for a second season with the show in 1903. Gus St. Leon and his family returned from America in 1906 after a long engagement with the Ringling Bros. Show and tours of Mexico and British Honduras.

Following his return, he made appearances with FitzGerald's Circus in 1908. He soon founded "Gus St. Leon's Great United Circus" in 1909, managed it with his family, and acted as ringmaster. It first toured as a traveling show in New South Wales and Queensland. Five of the young St. Leons, after performing in Europe and America, became part of their father's circus company.

By 1913, the St. Leon circus then included 36 performers, 40 horses, and a brass band of twelve. The show had toured widely, visiting Australia, New Zealand, Tasmania, China, Japan, and Africa, and attracting full houses in Melbourne, Sydney, and Brisbane. Gus St. Leon modernized the circus by replacing horse-drawn wagons with motor vehicles, leading it to its peak in the 1920s as it toured rural towns and agricultural shows. After disbanding, those carrying the St. Leon name joined other circuses.

He traveled in 1922 with "St. Leon and Sole Bros. United Circus & Menagerie," featuring three of his sons as an acrobatic troupe. The Sole Bros. built their reputation as skilled equestrians.

== Death ==
Gus St. Leon died on 17 October 1924, in Junee, New South Wales, Australia, at age 76.

== Legacy ==
Gus had a daughter and four sons named Cassimar, Cyril, Reginald, and Philip St. Leon.
