= Wieth =

Wieth is a surname. Notable people with the surname include:

- Carlo Wieth (1885–1943), Danish actor
- Clara Wieth (1883–1975), Danish actress, wife of Carlo
- Mogens Wieth (1919–1962), Danish actor

== See also ==
- Wirth
