= Marlboro Psychiatric Hospital =

Coordinates: 40°20′35″N 74°14′13″W

- State of New Jersey

Geography
- Location: Marlboro, New Jersey, United States

Organization
- Type: Specialist

Services
- Speciality: Psychiatry

History
- Founded: 1931
- Closed: 1998
- Demolished: 2015

Links
- Lists: Hospitals in New Jersey

Marlboro Psychiatric Hospital was a public hospital in Marlboro, New Jersey, United States, which was operated by the State of New Jersey. Construction of the hospital began in 1929. It first opened in early 1931, with Dr. J.B. Gordon as medical director. According to the site plan, the hospital's campus was on 468 acres (189 ha). A perimeter fence completely enclosed the property. The land was mostly a rural environment. When it closed, the hospital was on 594 acres (240 ha), having enlarged the grounds over the years. It opened with a capacity to accommodate 500-800 patients. The grounds construction continued after opening and when completed, the hospital was expected to have a capacity of 2,000 patients. However, in 1995, the hospital served an average of 780 adults per day with a staff of 1,157 employees and a total budget of $55.5 million (fiscal year 1995). The budget in 1998 was $68 million. The facility was closed July 1, 1998. The hospital finished complete demolition of the structures, tunnels, roads and other infrastructure in early 2015.

== Description ==
Starting in 1928, Five hundred and nine acres were eventually purchased by the State of New Jersey. Some of the land was in Wickatunk for the construction of Marlboro Psychiatric Hospital. The hospital's original working name was "Hillsdale asylum at Wickatunk". It was later known as "The Hilldale Development" before becoming known as "Marlboro Psychiatric Hospital" When first constructed, the hospital was composed of 17 "state of the art" cottages and central buildings. Each cottage would hold 55 patients. The initial project was budgeted for $6,000,000. Needing additional space, in 1934, two three story dormitories were also constructed for $300,000. In addition to the hospital grounds, the hospital initially maintained outpatient "mental hygiene clinics" in central New Jersey.

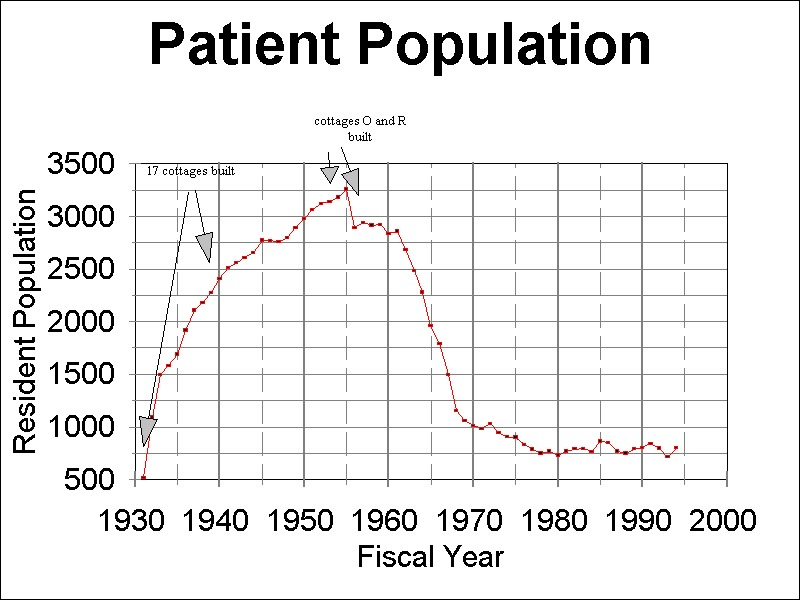
histoire de l'hôpital psychiatrique de Marlboro

Originally set up to treat adults, the hospital started treating children in 1939. At Marlboro Psychiatric Hospital, the cottages were initially Tudor style dormitories which housed as many as 55 patients each. The cottage model was selected because it was felt that treatment could best be provided by grouping similar diagnosed people. The cottages were all constructed around a huge ellipse with the exception of two cottages which were to house violent patients. A decision to provide air conditioning to hospital patients was made in 1965 with a budget of $40,000. This money was obtained from the profits from the patient item store called the "Jigger Shop". However, only a couple of high priority areas were done and the rest of the hospital remained unconditioned.

A decision to expand the scope of serviced counties occurred in 1972. At that time, Greystone Park Psychiatric Hospital which handled Essex county was overcrowded and Marlboro started to receive patients from western Essex county. In January 1972, 150 patients began arriving to relieve the over crowding and facilitate the ability to expand Graystone Hospital.

End of year patient population is shown in graph to right.

A decision to close the hospital was made in 1995 by Governor Christine Todd Whitman; following a 1993 investigation by then state senator Richard J. Codey, during which he went undercover at the hospital and found rampant patient abuse, wasteful spending, and other illegal practices. His report stated that he saw patients "were treated with less care than the average prisoner." The process was to start in 1996 and complete the process in three years. The goal was to place patients in community support homes. An initial plan was to provide a $450 a month stipend and "create 40 mobile outreach teams to provide therapy and help with housing, medication and daily living. The teams would include psychologists, nurses and mental health advocates who would be on call 24 hours a day". The hospital closed in 1998.

== Structures ==
=== Fireproof construction ===
The buildings were considered fireproof - the floors were of concrete covered by linoleum, and the walls and partitions were made of hollow tile. Asbestos was used on pipes and between floors to retard any fire outbreak, which became a significant issue during demolition.

=== Hospital tunnels ===
Tunnels were constructed between the buildings to facilitate movement of people and supplies between the structures in all types of weather. They were used to deliver equipment, food and the movement of patients and staff. In later years, showing their age, the tunnels were problematic. Low-hanging pipes often dropped dirt and other items. They were reported to be "dark, dirty and had a foul odor... there was urine and excrement on the floors". The tunnels were also the location of a number of suicides.

=== Building expansion ===
In March 1931, five buildings were completed to accommodate 500 patients. A few months later in June, a total of six buildings were completed and four more patient cottages were almost complete. The hospital was originally envisioned as being a "self contained community". Originally intended to house a population of 2000 patients; however, 3000 patients was reached in 1933. In 1937 funds from the WPA were used for a building, added to accommodate 650 additional patients. In 1939 three additional administrative buildings, silos, barns and some other out buildings were constructed. Overcrowding was again addressed in 1944 with the passage of a bill authorizing $400,000 part of which was for emergency construction of two dormitory units designed for 80 patients each. Continued to be overcrowded, the hospital population was reported to be 2812 in December 1945. A state review of the hospital in 1947 showed a census of 2736 patients. The review further stated "the scenes in the crowded quarters for senile patients were not such to make anyone proud of the support... given to this needy group." In 1949, Dr. Gordon stated that "patient wards have been established in basements, sun porches and corridors." In 1951, $300,000 was appropriated for a 280-bed building which was constructed for senile patients. State voters provided a $730,000 bond for the construction of four dormitory structures on the property and provide an additional 312 beds. In 1977, the aging hospital required some capitol environmental improvements, electrical upgrades, roof repairs and new boilers. Money was appropriated for these updates in 1975 bond vote. In 1987, a $4 million plan to rebuild parts of the hospital included a second admission unit, two more patient cottages, and conversion of medical services building to a day activity center.

=== Chapel ===
An interdenominational Chapel was added to the hospital in 1962. The Chapel construction budget was $80,000 and came from profits at the hospital snack shop. It was constructed for religious services as well as for counseling. It had offices for the Roman Catholic resident priest, Protestant chaplain and the part-time Episcopal and Jewish chaplains. There was also room for visiting ministers. It was 33 feet high and 64 feet long and large enough to accommodate 80 people for services. It was a one-story red brick building with a pitched roof. The Marlboro Hospital Auxiliary funded the purchase of an organ for the chapel. The back edifice held a string of bells suspended vertically. The bells represented the faiths which served religious programs offered at the hospital. In addition to the indoor altar, the building had an outdoor one also to permit larger gatherings, concerts, and other programs.

=== Other structures ===
The large barn on the prison property was constructed with funds from President Roosevelt's W.P.A jobs project. This was following approval of $78,761 for construction and improvement of the hospital property. There was an auditorium built in 1956 for functions and services and in 1959 a greenhouse was also constructed for patient occupational therapy services. A medical supply room was added following the awarding of $33,000 budget in 1962. Also in 1962, the sewers and fire hydrants were considered inadequate to the need and required updating.

== Outreach programs ==
=== Bridgeway House ===
The Bridgeway House was started in March 1959. The project was a converted three story Victorian building in Red Bank, New Jersey. It was experimental and "the first of its kind in the country". The focus was to provide older persons and psychiatric patients residential and social options after recovery from the illness at Marlboro Hospital. It is to provide a bridge between hospital life and community life. In addition to the facility, a day clinic was also established as a Senior day center. Following on the success of Bridgeway House, a similar program was opened in Elizabeth in 1964. A clinic was also opened at Paul Kimball hospital in Lakewood.

=== Discovery House ===
The Discovery House was a building on the hospital grounds. The focus of this building was to house a residential program for drug and alcohol abuse patients.

== Staff issues ==
=== Budget ===
In 1995 the hospital was staffed by 1157 employees. The hospital budget in 1998 was at $68 million.

=== Medical director ===
Given the length of the hospital's operation; the hospital saw a number of medical directors:

- The first medical director of the hospital was Dr. J. Berkely Gorden. He started at the inception of the hospital and retired in 1962.
- Dr. D. W. McCreight was acting director and appointed to fill the seat till a permanent medical director could be located following the retirement of Dr. Gorden. His tenure was from 1962 to 1963.
- He was replaced by Dr. Robert P, Nenno. Dr Nenno started as medical director in 1963 and was there till 1968. Prior to his appointment at Marlboro Hospital, he was a chairman of Medicine at Seton Hall College.
- Dr. Michael R. Simon was medical director from 1968 to 1973.
- Dr. Harold J. Knobb, took over as acting medical director at the resignation of Dr. Simon. He served from 1973 to 1974.
- Dr Herbert Saexinger became medical director in 1974 to 1976.
- Dr. Charles Webber, became acting medical director in 1976 when Dr. Saexinger resigned and was in office till 1977 when a replacement was found.
- Roy S. Ettlinger - chief executive officer from 1977 to 1983. He left the job to become director of a hospital in Boston.
- Dr. David Sorensen was chief executive officer from 1984 to 1987, when he was removed from office following allegations of patient abuse, staff neglect and sexual assaults while he was in charge.
- Dr. Michael Ross was the acting chief executive officer at the hospital starting in 1987. Dr. Ross was the chief executive officer at Graystone Park Hospital prior to this post.
- Dr. Norbert Binkowski was the Clinical Director from 1978 to 1990.

=== Emergency services ===
Marlboro Psychiatric Hospital had its own fire and police emergency departments. These were independent from the emergency services in the Marlboro Township community. However, for criminal investigations, New Jersey State police had jurisdiction to conduct the investigations and charge the suspects.

=== World War II staffing issues ===
During World War II the hospital was seriously depleted of trained professionals. The armed services took 10 physicians, 6 dentists and 50 nurses, 200 attendants as well as an assortment of other trained professionals. The staff was complemented by addition of conscientious objectors who were provided housing and a $15 monthly stipend.

=== Mennonite Camp ===
From November 1942 to October 1946 the Mennonite Central Committee opened a Civilian Public Service Camp on the ground of the property. The camp was identified as CPS 063–01. The Mennonites are restricted from military service and were considered conscientious objector. Some men of that faith chose to serve the country by helping out at the hospital. The group started with 25 men from central Pennsylvania who were Mennonites or Amish. Most of the men served as ward attendants, however if they had special talents or training they could serve under that capacity. For example, one person was a trained physician (Dr. Clarke T Case). He was allowed to attend to sick patients at the hospital. Over the four years the unit grew. One report put the total men at one hundred and three men, many married. Another report put the total men at one hundred and seventy nine people.

The medical director of the hospital personally selected the first twenty-five men from Medaryville, Indiana CPS Camp No 28 and Henry, Illinois CPS Camp No. 22. Due to staffing shortages when he saw the project working, Dr. Gordon sent a person to other conscientious objector camps in Maryland and Virginia in the hopes of recruiting more people. When speaking at an engagement about the CPS workers he said, "they're strictly on the level - and a blessing to our institution in releasing the manpower shortage... they are not cowards, they just don't believe in war, more specifically in killing their fellow man... for religious reasons"

Using these men as attendants was not without some problems. In 1946, an error occurred when one patient died after a Mennonite worker gave the patient wrong medication, a heart stimulant rather than cough medicine. However, overall they were reported by Dr. Gordon to be "valuable aids" to the patients. After the war service was up, one of the Mennonites returned to the hospital to work there.

Eleanor Roosevelt visited on January 16, 1943. She inspected the hospital and visited with the CPS men.

=== Staff housing ===
In addition to single accommodations in the upper floors of the Cottages, the hospital provided furnished housing for single and married staff. There was a larger home, located on the west corner of the hospital grounds facing Route 520. This was used by the medical director. In the 1960s the hospital also constructed a small development consisting of two rows of homes which were next to the medical directors house.

Housing for staff was segregated up to 1964. At that time the segregation policy was eliminated.

=== Staff strike ===
==== Employee strikes ====
The staff at the Marlboro Psychiatric Hospital had multiple unions for various workers. There were multiple strikes at the hospital to protest pay and working conditions.

- July 1970, the "nonprofessional hospital workers" staged a three-day sick-out over demands for the employees to collectively bargin.
- In August 1977, the staff at the hospital held a "24-hour job action". The focus of this work stoppage centered around "Work schedules and staffing problems". The strike left the hospital with minimal staff. Up to 100 employees picketed the main gate during the strike. The employees walked out for three shifts. Of the 161 staff working the 7am to 3pm shift 23 reported for work. In addition, inmates at the prison camp refused to cross the picket line. However, frequently the unions were not in agreement. In another instance of hospital strikes, one of the union bargaining units voted to strike while the other union bargaining units voted to cross the picket line.
- In August 1983, the staff voted to strike over unsafe working conditions and overcrowding of patients.
- March 1987, 150 employees staged a mass demonstration at the facility, claiming racial discrimination in the hiring practices at the hospital.

==== Hospital police ====
In April 1978, about two dozen hospital police picketed the Marlboro State Hospital. The issue was over the right to carry weapons during the shifts at the hospital. The issue started a few days prior when an assailant fired a shotgun at the officers. At the time, if weapons were required, state police were called along with local Marlboro Township police departments.

=== Interns ===
Marlboro Psychiatric Hospital utilized the services of interns. The hospital participated in the Department of Human Services Psychology Junior Fellow Program. This was a program which helped to train psychology interns from the area schools.

== Patient treatment ==
=== Admission diagnosis ===
In 1942, Medical Director Dr. J.B. Gordon identified the major causes of admission to Marlboro Psychiatric Hospital at that time. He stated that 7% of all admissions were for paresis. He further identified that other major causes were for "Dementia praecox, manic-depressive psychosis, cerebral arteriosclerosis, senility and alcoholism." Dr. C. Coakley Graves, a resident psychiatrist at the hospital, spoke about syphilis being a significant cause of hospitalization.

=== Hypnosis ===
Dr Elsworth Baker, Chief at the woman's unit at Marlboro Hospital, identified hypnosis as a treatment modality for a small percentage of patients at the hospital. He stated it was used for "cases where the imaginary symptoms of disease" presented as the primary symptoms. Dr Sydney Hodas, a consulting psychiatrist, stated that using hypnotic suggestion contributed to cures in about 40% of the patients there.

=== Children's unit ===
The children's unit was started in December 1939. In January 1942, the hospital had 22 children ranging in age from 7 to 16, but that number had increased to 37 youth by that December. In 1946, Marlboro Hospital opened a children's unit at the Arthur Brisbane estate in Allaire. 35 Children from the hospital unit were transferred there and only acute patients were kept at the hospital in Marlboro. The children's unit was closed in 1978 and the youth were transferred to other units. In June 1980, adolescent patients were also phased out of treatment at the hospital. In 1946, the Arthur Brisbane estate was willed to the State Hospital. Marlboro Hospital converted this to the "Marlboro State Children's Unit" and most children were transferred to this hospital.

=== Experimental treatments ===
In addition to the medical director using "selective sterilization and eugenics" practices, in 1937, consensual Insulin experiments were conducted at Marlboro Psychiatric Hospital. Eight Men and eight women were used in the experiments with mixed results from "definitely cured" to "no improvement". The focus of the treatment was to try to treat dementia praecox The advances in medications brought about drug treatment experiments. Under the direction of Dr. John B.K. Smith there were four classes of drug treatments in 1962.

=== Hospital reorganization ===
In September 1963, the hospital was reorganized into four units. The four units were, geriatrics, children (broken into two units "cottage 16" for below 14 years old and "cottage 17" for 14–18 years old), medical-surgical, and maximum security.

=== Problems with patient care ===
Going back to 1936 when the hospital was performing autopsies on patients without consent of family; Marlboro Psychiatric Hospital had a history of problems. Following a tour of the hospital in 1967, Assemblyman Joseph Azzolina stated that the hospital conditions were "so bad it turned my stomach".

==== Food poisoning ====
On November 2, 1979, 131 patients and two employees became ill and five patients died of food poisoning. The suspected cause was Clostridium perfringens. On May 9, 1987, the eighth probe was conducted by the Public Advocate's Office into patient deaths. It was identified that months before the food poisoning incident, the Senior food service worker had complained to state officials about the "unsanitary kitchen conditions". The conditions included rodent droppings, dirty equipment and mold. Patients became ill and had severe diarrhea after eating tainted chicken. The doctor on duty waited six hours after reports to him about patients becoming sick and misdiagnosed the first few patients he saw until the condition had become very serious for the patients Two months after the poisoning incident, state health department officials examining the kitchens found food service conditions continue to provide "ample opportunity for an outbreak to recur in the future"

==== Abuse and neglect ====
In 1986, a 38-year-old patient was transferred to Marlboro Psychiatric Hospital. Her physical condition was serious; she had a low sodium level in her blood from poor nutrition. At the hospital, her blood was not monitored by the staff. The public advocate described the care at the hospital towards this patient as "reckless and negligent".

==== Money Theft ====
In 1992, a patient was encouraged to take money out of his hospital account and turn it over to a staff member. In return, a staff member had stated he would take the patient to the Monmouth Mall. This was against hospital policy.

==== Patients leaving the hospital without permission ====
Occasionally reported in the press, many patients just walked away from the hospital care. Some of the more notable cases were:

- In September 1937, an escaped patient was held on "morals charges" after a complaint from two women.
- 1942, due to low staff levels (due to the war), at least 12 inmates walked away from the hospital.
  - Edna Gilsenan walked away from the hospital and was "considered very dangerous"
  - David Hardenbrook walked to a railroad bridge and "dived" to a meadow 60 feet below (he survived).
- In June 1948, two patients were found outside the hospital grounds in a nearby town "acting suspicious".
- June 1971, Henry Mayer, violent offender was hospitalized following severely beating his daughter escaped from the hospital.
- In November 1973, William Coburn left hospital supervision. He hid on the grounds for 6 days and finally surrendered. Because of severe exposure both legs were amputated due to frostbite.
- December 1974, 5 patients escape from the hospital. One is apprehended on the hospital grounds and 4 others steal a car from a local residence. They get into an auto accident shortly after starting out. They abandon the car after the accident and flee on foot.
- In 1976, the Mayor of Marlboro Township requested that Governor Byrne declare a state of emergency due to the high number of incidents of patients leaving without permission. This following an incident of a patient leaving the grounds and assaulted a police officer. The Mayor cited that there had been 650 patients who had walked away from the institute.
- In 1979, a man who had killed his father and brother with a machete, left the hospital grounds and was found trying to steal a tire in Marlboro.
- In 1980, a patient walked out of Cottage 10, grabbed a visitor's keys from her hand and stole the car. He drove across the hospital grounds outside the hospital. He had an auto accident with another vehicle close to the hospital and was returned to his unit.
- In 1984, there were 151 reported incidents of patients leaving the hospital. A patient escaped from the hospital twice and broke into a local house. In one incident, the homeowner hit the patient with a piece of glass before police could arrive to arrest the patient.
- In 1995, William Jennings, who was committed to the hospital following murdering his parents, had been granted grounds privileges and left the hospital. He was found at Walt Disney World in Florida confused and disoriented.

At a special community meeting in Marlboro, Dr. Seaxinger stated there had been 900 absent patients in the last year and a half. He stated the hospital was going to change the system and establish a special pass system for hospital grounds use by patients. By 1984, there were 151 incidents of missing patients.

==== Suicide ====
Suicide was a constant problem, with reports going back to the time close to the opening of the hospital. Speaking in 1949, Dr. Gordon stated that there had been 15 suicides in the last 18 years. He identified that the suicides at the facility "wouldn't occur if we had the facilities to keep the patients safe". In 1972, within a two-month span, there were at least 4 suicides in the basement of a building at the hospital.

==== Patient abuse ====
- In 1946, a hospital attendant was charged with beating a patient by fracturing his jaw in two places after the attendant "lost his temper". *A woman who disappeared 48 hours before the hospital noticed her missing was found frozen to death outside. A woman was restricted to liquid food due to an eating disorder, choked to death when someone gave her a peanut butter sandwich. A patient died from brain swelling caused by a sodium deficiency noted in her charts 6 weeks earlier yet left untreated. A man who was strapped to a bed for 80 hours over 5 days died from blood clots caused by the restraints (which must be loosened every two hours).
- In November 1995, a 64-year-old patient, Regina Killen, died of a broken neck after being lifted from the floor and getting her head wedged into a wheel chair. However, the autopsy report also listed other issues, "three broke vertebrae, seven broken ribs and a spinal cord injury, along with hemorrhaging and bruising from her chin to her knee."
- Police charged a nurse of sexually assaulting two female patients in 1997. He was also charged with distribution of sedatives at the hospital.

==== Non-psychiatric treatment ====
While the hospital focus was primarily a psychiatric treatment, there are reports of other medical procedures being performed. Procedures such as an operation for appendicitis were reported. Additionally, the hospital was noted to treat cases of pneumonia for patients and staff.

==== Benevolent Concentration Camp ====
In 1977, Dr. Roy Ettlinger - Medical Director - suggested that the reduced funding and state appropriations resulted in the hospital becoming a "benevolent concentration camp".

==== Overcrowding ====
Due to Essex County freezing admissions to local facilities, Marlboro Psychiatric hospital had increased admissions from those area. The hospital could only accommodate 790 patients. However, the patient count had exceeded this number - "Overcrowding has become the total preoccupation of the entire hospital". In 1983, the hospital instituted the "Fair Weather" program to address overcrowding. Essentially, this was a plan for deinstitutionalization.

=== Deinstitutionalization ===
Marlboro Psychiatric Hospital was the first of the major psychiatric facilities in New Jersey to close. The process known as "deinstitutionalization" was a state plan to move patients to local community living. When the hospital was closed, patients were transferred to non-permanent treatment, state-funded independent living and other psychiatric hospitals. Some patients were transferred to other psychiatric facilities. The hospital sent 760 patients to three other hospitals: Trenton Psychiatric Hospital, Ancora Psychiatric Hospital and Greystone Park Hospital. However, Monmouth County played a major role in the deinstitutionalization of the hospital population. A disproportionate number of people were housed in many of the larger boarding homes in the shore communities along the coast. The patients were given a stipend of $450 a month for room and board.

== Patient social offerings ==
=== Orchestra ===
The hospital had a patient orchestra directed by Dr. Julius A. Toren. Started in 1937, it quickly grew to 45 members in 1939. In 1940, the orchestra was directed by Mr. Mankoff. They were regionally known and provided off-site area concerts in locations such as the Marlboro Fire House, The Freehold Presbyterian Church, and the Marlboro Baptist Church, The orchestra also performed and were broadcast on radio at the Berkley Carteret in Asbury Park on October 13, 1939.

=== Snack shop ===
The hospital maintained a small store for patients to purchase small personal items and snacks. Called the "Jigger Shop", the snack shop directed the profits from the operation to fund social activities and capital improvements such as the construction of the chapel on the hospital grounds.

=== Clothing shops ===
Run by the hospital Auxiliary, there were two clothing shops ("Esquire" and "Vanity Fair") which contained largely donated clothes. Some of the cloths were also made in the occupational therapy department. With permission, a patient could go to the shop and select an outfit for use for a visitation, weekend pass or home visit.

=== Social activities ===
In addition to cards, newspapers, magazines, puzzles, bingo and sporting equipment such as basketball and shuffleboard; There was an active hospital auxiliary at the hospital and they created many social activities for the patients, created radio and television rooms, offered weekly movies, held crafting activities, occasional dances and created seasonal parties:

- An annual 'Christmas Shop' was established by the Marlboro Hospital Auxiliary to help the patients purchase Christmas gifts for friends and family.
- Started in 1947, during the summer months there were two picnics (frequently more) scheduled for 50 patients at a pond on the campus.
- For many years in the 1950s the Marlboro Post American Legion Auxiliary entertained the Veterans at the state hospital - provided various performances throughout the year but specifically at a Christmas Party - Cigarettes were given out as gifts.
- A Monmouth county Symphony orchestra was formed "for the express purpose of giving monthly concerts" at the hospital. However, there were other musical performances from other organizations also offered.
- Local Woman's clubs and American Legion would organize and provide "card parties", "social teas", music and dancing, and ice cream socials for patients at the hospital on a frequent basis.
- Occasionally, local theater productions or magic shows would perform at the hospital for the patients.
- Ceramics, Painting and Wood working craft rooms and multiple beauty parlor were also available for patient use and furnished by the hospital auxiliary. There were occasional exhibits of the art work in various venues.
- Occasional bands and concerts performed at the hospital. At one time, Bruce Springsteen's band The Castiles played at the hospital. During this performance, the patients sang along with the song "We gotta get out of this place!".
- From the late 1960s to the mid 1970s the hospital sponsored an annual "Strawberry Festival".

A drive to collect musical instruments was done in 1949 and again in 1953. At that time, in addition to 15 pianos collected, other musical instruments were obtained for the patients of the hospital to use. The next year the instruments were repaired having gotten hard use by the patients.

In addition to providing significant social activities for the patients, the Marlboro Hospital Auxiliary published a newsletter to announce the activities and appeal to community donations to keep the various projects funded.

=== Picture initiative ===
In July 1975, the hospital social committee requested area people to send in pictures about the hospital. The idea was to frame 8x10 pictures to hang in the patient areas, to make the hospital look less institutional.

=== Scouting involvement ===
Boy Scout Pack 236 was formed on the hospital grounds for the younger patients in 1964; followed by Troop 236. Richard J, Lord was both the Cubmaster and Scoutmaster. This was mostly for patients with an Intellectual disability diagnosis living at the hospital. They were allowed to attend overnight camping events and cook outside on the campus. They also participated in scouting council activities. In 1964, one of the members from the troop was selected to a one-week tour of duty at the New York Worlds Fair as a service guide. In another council event they were noted to be making corn husk dolls for a Scouting Bicentennial council activity. Dr. Nenno furthered the assessment in saying that the Boy Scout troop on the campus "has done wonderfully for them. Some have been in the hospital for years. It has given them life. Now they feel a little more human. They could not get along more famously."

=== Semi-pro basketball team ===
Shortly after the opening of the hospital, it owned a semi-pro basketball team. They recruited players from the local high schools. Hymie Welling was recruited in December 1934.

== Prior land use ==
The grounds which became the hospital were largely rural farms before construction began. However, there was a rather large distillery on the property which was torn down to make room for the hospital. From 1825 to about 1850, part of the land was used as a tannery by John Hulse. The 509 acres purchased by the state for the hospital grounds were purchased for $76,000. It was reported that the houses and farms which were obtained in 1928 were considered "very old". Some of the structured destroyed for the hospital and farm were built before the Revolutionary War.

== Homeless housing ==
In 1988, the Freehold Township council suggested a plan to use some of the property at the Marlboro Psychiatric Hospital to house homeless families. The plan was suggested to place families in mobile homes on the "Doctors Circle", a remote part of the property. Other plans were offered to use 32 small rooms in a building at the hospital to house people.

== Farming ==
=== Hospital farm ===
The hospital had a 760 acre working farm on some of the hospital grounds. The farm provided vegetables, pigs, poultry, grains, strawberries, peas, beans, carrots, fruit trees and 120 Holstein cows for dairy products. The produce was used by the hospital for internal consumption as well as was canned and sold to other institutions in the state. In 1951, the farm and slaughterhouse provided 32 percent of the food needed to sustain the hospital population. The hospital patients were used to provide the labor in the fields and during the food production process. It was felt that the "open air work provides relief from the boredom of the hospital wards." The work was voluntary and supervised when the patients were in the field. In 1951, the cannery turned out 60,000 gallons of canned vegetables and fruit and over 60,000 pounds of pork. There were forty acres of apple and peach trees on the farm. The Dairy Barn to house the cows burned in February 1948.

=== Rahway Prison ===
In addition to psychiatric patients, Rahway Prison had a work camp unit established in 1959 on 15 acres across the road from the hospital. Called the "Rahway State Prison Honor Camp", it was one of 5 similar camps established in the state. the prison farm helped with the care of the livestock and farming, were groundskeepers, laundry and kitchen aids. It was an ultra-minimum security prison farm located on the hospital property.

It housed 120 inmates and all of them were trustees. In addition to helping at the hospital, the inmates were also eligible for college classes offered through the Brookdale Community College. Generally, one and two classes were offered at a time, three nights a week at the prison camp.

Occasionally, prisoners would escape from this institution. Clyde Norton left the hospital laundry in 1963 and was picked up in Somerville, New Jersey. In 1972, Johnnie Cooper; serving a sentence for armed robbery, was found after another one such escape attempt. Community concern peaked in 1976 when over a 6-month period 15 inmates escaped the facility. However, this continued to be a problem during the life of the prison camp. Escapes would continue to periodically happen. In 1974, a policy was established to provide Marlboro Township police with mugshots of all prisoners housed at the prison farm to facilitate capture of escapees.

In 1977, two prisoners who attempted to escape were charged with the rape of a female patient. Starting in the late 1970s largely in response to community requests, hospital pressures, and inmate escapes; the inmate population started to decrease. The population in 1980 was about 70 inmates. However, prison issues continue; Timothy Knight left the grounds in 1983 and was captured close by in Holmdel Township, New Jersey.

=== Agricultural Experimental Station ===
Started in 1938 as the "Erosion Research Station", part of the farm was turned over to the state agricultural college at Rutgers and the US department of agriculture for experimental use. It was on this property that alternative tilling was done, various fertilizers were tried, Irrigation methods used and various experimental farming practices were tried. At one part of the property "contour farming was used" and experimentation tried. Crops produced on this land using these methods were turned over to the hospital for consumption. The director of the experimental station initially was Dr. Jacob G. Lipman. The second director was Gerow Brill who left the post in 1942 after being called to active service by the Army.

== Hospital investigations ==
=== Codey investigation ===
Senator Richard J. Codey wanted to determine the standards of employee hiring and training in state institutions. To accomplish this, he went undercover to work at Marlboro Hospital. He had gained access to the hospital by applying for employment using the ID of a convicted rapist and social security number of a deceased convicted felon/possible sex offender. His background was never checked and he was assigned to work on one of the most regressed cottages at the hospital; Cottage 16. This cottage housed patients on two levels; first floor and basement. The basement level, all male, housed patients who were often speechless, incoherent or actively psychotic and included those who had murdered outside or inside the hospital. Senator Codey used his experience at the hospital to advocate for stricter rules of employment, including fingerprint and background checks. Additionally, the investigation resulted in the head of the hospital, Dr. David A. Sorenson, being "reassigned".

=== 1993 investigation ===
In an executive summary issued in mid-1993, after the 15 month 1993 investigation, showed 'irregularities and questionable activities' at the hospital. "The results of the investigation reveal a tableau of waste, fraud, thievery and corruption in which the squandering of taxpayer dollars virtually has become business as usual at this institution. Senior Hospital officials repeatedly exercised lax supervision and poor judgment, allowing multiple abuses to flourish either by directly participating in them or by simply turning a blind eye." The result was a number of personnel suspended or removed, contracts stopped, and changes to the procedures at the hospital.

=== 1987 investigation ===
A report by the US Health Care Financing Administration issued a report that Marlboro Hospital could lose its hospital accreditation. This warning was after the report suggested the hospital was understaffed and it was warned it needed to increase the size of its staff. The report also found a general "insensitivity on the part of the administration to patients, staff and community needs".

=== Joint Commission (1979) ===
The Joint Commission on Accreditation of Hospitals reviewed the hospital and the hospital gained accreditation. This allows the hospital to accept medicaid payments for indigent patients. They stayed three days and investigated staff levels, quality of care, facilities and management practices. The reviewers were impressed with the way patient audits were conducted at the hospital by the staff and stated they wanted to use the system developed at Marlboro Hospital as a model for other psychiatric hospitals.

=== 1965 investigation ===
The New Jersey Tenement House Commission reported deficiencies at the hospital. At that time 272 bedridden patients occupied the fourth floor of a building. In addition, the staff are housed on the top floor of the building. There was no outside fire escape and only one stairway for egress in an emergency. These issues were noted in reports from the state fire marshal in 1947 as well as a report in 1953.

=== 1963 investigation ===
In 1963, the Monmouth County Grand Jury looked into the treatment of sex offenders and reviewed if the hospital is following the NJ Statue concerning treatment of people committed to the hospital due to sexual offences. It concluded that there was a lack of personnel, lack of program and facilities were unable to give the people the specialized treatment for sexual offence treatment. They found that the patient to doctor ratio was 400 to one and there was one nurse per floor; which was considered inadequate. A solution was reached in that if these patients become security risks, they will be transferred to the Vroom building at Trenton Psychiatric Hospital.

== Unusual events ==
- In 1954, bad weather forced a light plane to land on the hospital property. Robert S. Miller was the pilot of the plane.
- In June 1963 a full circus was presented to the patients, on the hospital grounds. The circus was performed by the Hunt Bros. Circus in front of 1700 patients who then were served a picnic supper. A circus was again brought in in 1964. The Von Brothers Circus performed before almost 2000 patients.
- In 1964, the hospital was used as a backdrop for a film production. "Gateway to Return" was a 27.5 minute color film designed to follow two patients from the entrance to discharge from the state hospital system. It premiered at the hospital on May 23, 1965.
- A bomb scare was called into the hospital on October 29, 1972. The hospital evacuated about 500 patients from the hospital. The caller said the bomb would go off at 5:00 PM. The staff waited till 5:15 PM, as there was no event, the patients at the hospital were returned to the units.
- In November 1979 a widespread food poisoning outbreak at the hospital sickened 131 patients and killed four more.

== Abandoned hospital grounds ==
Before demolition, Marlboro Township was informed by the U.S. military that it would be using the property for military training. This training exercise included using explosives in and around the buildings on the property. The property was also used by the New Jersey State Police for training exercises.

Since its 1998 closing, the abandoned hospital has become the focus of numerous local legends. An abandoned slaughterhouse on the property fueled legends of a murderous farmer. It was said that the farmer would lure you down "death row," as he had to two slain hospital guards. Trespassing at the slaughterhouse became a frequent problem, and the township publicly stated that trespassers would be prosecuted. According to an issue of Weird New Jersey magazine, and the book Convergence, shadow people were often spotted in, or around, the slaughterhouse. The slaughterhouse was razed.

In January 2010, a fire was reported in one of the buildings at the former hospital. Local fire companies responded and extinguished the fire but the building was a total loss.

== Demolition ==
The state demolished eight cottages built between 1929 and 1974 in the hospital complex, in part due to the ghost stories and trespassing of ghost hunters who illegally enter the property and in part because of the serious health hazard caused by asbestos used throughout the buildings. The police reported about 100 calls to the property annually.

In June 2013, the demolition of the hospital buildings started. The demolition of the buildings is through a contract with the NJDPMC. Destruction of the buildings could be seen from the main road Route 520. By 2015 the property had been completely demolished. Buildings, streetlights, roads and underground structures were demolished and removed from the property.

The only structures left on the property was an active waste treatment facility and related buildings. The waste treatment plant services New Hope Project facility. In June 2011, $3.58 million was appropriated from Clean Waters bond fund for sewerage infrastructure improvements so the plant could continue to function.

On November 17, 2021, a worker died in a fall at the Marlboro State Hospital site. The man was working on the roof and fell inside the building, according to Sgt. Alejandro Goez, a spokesman for the New Jersey State Police.

== Future plans ==
In 1998, the New Jersey Economic Commission put most of the property at the hospital up for sale. Various land-use suggestions became known. Among the various options were a corporate park, residential development, nursing or assisted living facility, and a school campus. In 2002, Marlboro Township voted to select a developer the rights to develop the property for residential use.

They later reversed themselves after lobbied by multiple parties to create New Jersey Open Space. On November 18, 2011, New Jersey state officials announced that the hospital site would become open space for recreational use. It was no longer be under state jurisdiction. Instead, the Monmouth County Park System would oversee the property. Demolishing buildings and cleaning up the property to meet environmental standards was necessary for completing the $27 million project. In 2013, the clean-up of the contaminated soil, asbestos, and wastewater facility had climbed to $75 million.

The project was slated for completion in 2013, but was pushed back to 2016. The park system has reclaimed some of the hospital land and has opened "Big Brook Park" in 2011. Demolition of the buildings began in May 2014 and has since been completed. All the structures on the property have been removed both above and below ground.

On February 21, 2019, Marlboro Township voted to provide $1.78 million to, in part, provide for the installation of a water main at the Marlboro Hospital Main Loop / Conover Road.

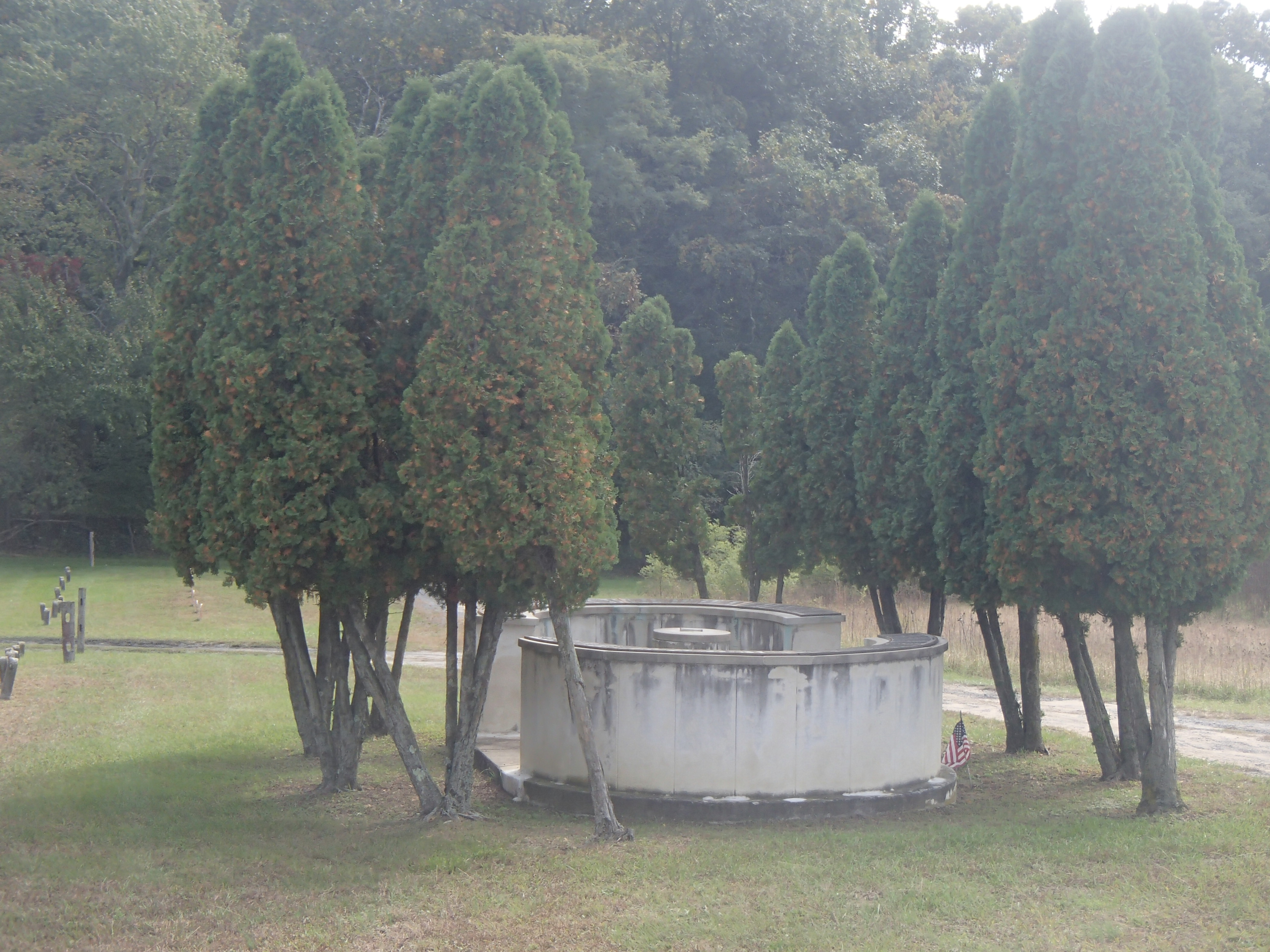
Marlboro Cemetery grave locator.

== Hospital cemetery ==
The hospital operated a cemetery on County Route 520. It is located across from the former main hospital entrance. Designed as part of the original grounds plan, it opened along with the hospital in 1931. The cemetery administrators laid out the plat of burial spaces and numbered them. They proceeded to order inexpensive stone grave markers, marked only with corresponding numbers. Except for one, there are over 920 graves which are either metal or cement headstones.

Some patients died without having had contact with family for many years and an immediate next of kin was not readily identified. Under those circumstances the entire record, which may have spanned decades of hospitalization was researched in an attempt to locate a responsible party. In the event that no next of kin was located or they were unable to provide a private burial, a state burial was authorized. The first patient to die with no next of kin at Marlboro Psychiatric Hospital was buried in plot One, and Marker 1 was placed on the grave. The 600th patient to die was placed in grave site 600 and Marker 600 was placed upon the grave, etc. There are 924 graves in the cemetery. The first 600 markers were made of a concrete substance with numbers on them, and after that all the markers were thin and made of pre-fabricated metal.

Originally, the standard practice was followed for cemetery visitors to check a printed list for the plot number of their deceased of interest. They used a printed map of the cemetery to find the burial location. But as burial numbers increased, a different location method was chosen.

In 1991, the state built a pavilion that provided a cross reference for the numbers to names. The names/numbers on the bronze tablets are all in date order. A central location was chosen for constructing the raised, stone dais or platform. The names and plot numbers of the deceased were engraved in brass frames, arranged at waist level in a huge circle. At one time, the dais had a rotating azimuth – like a weather vane – which could be aimed at the target marker. This allowed visitors to choose a landmark in or outside the cemetery boundary, and commence walking towards it, in order to reach the correct marker.

The cemetery is now within Big Brook Park of the Monmouth County Park System.
