= Dennis Kuchar =

Australian cardiologist

Dennis Lawrence Kuchar (b. 7 June 1956 - d. 7 May 2022) was a cardiologist based in Sydney, Australia. He performed research on the signal averaged ECG. This research laid the groundwork for the current paradigm of ECG use for prediction of sudden death.

== History ==
Kuchar grew up in Coogee, where he attended Coogee Public School. He graduated with an MB BS (Honors) from Sydney University in 1978. In 1987, at the age of 29, he received his MD from Sydney University and FRACP from the Royal Australasian College of Physicians.

Kuchar was associated with St Vincent's Hospital, Victor Chang Cardiac Research Institute and St Vincent's Heart, specializing in cardiac arrhythmias, catheter ablation, pacemakers and implantable cardioverter-defibrillators. Mentored by Victor Chang, Kuchar was involved the heart transplant of Fiona Coote.

Kuchar made news in April 2007 when he noted that the new Lexus autolocking technology system could interfere with the settings of implantable defibrillators, with potentially fatal consequences.

== Professional appointments ==
Dr. Kuchar's appointments include:

- 1979 Professorial Intern, Sydney Hospital
- 1980-1 Resident Medical Officer, Sydney Hospital
- 1982-3 Cardiology Registrar, St Vincent's Hospital, Sydney
- 1984-6 Cardiology Fellow, St Vincent's Hospital, Sydney
- 1986-8 Cardiology Fellow, Massachusetts General Hospital, Boston
- 1988 Cardiology Fellow, St Vincent's Hospital, Sydney
- 1989-93 Clinical Assistant (Cardiology), St Vincent's Hospital, Sydney
- 1993- Staff Cardiologist, St Vincent's Hospital, Sydney
- 1998 Director, Coronary Care Unit, St Vincent's Hospital, Sydney

== Publications ==
Kuchar has over 50 professional publications to his credit.

== Personal life ==
In addition to his work in cardiology, Kuchar was a painter whose artwork has been published and shown in a number of Sydney locations.

Kuchar married Dianne Neuhauser of Melbourne in 1978. The two have a daughter, Cara, born 2 August 1982, and two sons, Ari Emil, born in 1984, and Natan Eli, born 2 June 1988.
