= Hunt Bros. Circus =

Former American circus

Origin
- Circus name: Hunt Brothers Circus
- Country: United States
- Founder(s): Charles T. Hunt Sr.
- Year founded: 1892

Information
- Operator(s): Charles Jr., Harry, and Edward Hunt
- Ringmaster(s): Phil Wirth (1937-1958)
- Winter quarters: Florence, New Jersey

The Hunt Bros. Circus was an American circus founded by Charles T. Hunt in 1892. It was the first circus to motorize all its equipment, introduce air-conditioning, use flameproof tents, and stage a Wild West after-show.

== History ==
Charles T. Hunt Sr. founded the Hunt Brothers Circus in 1892. Hunt Bros. Circus first wintered in Kingston, New York, before later moving its winter quarters to Pikesville, Maryland.

Hunt Bros. became the first motorized circus in 1915. In 1924, with no trailer rigs available commercially, they built their own to transport the show.

The show had become a three-ring circus by 1933. Hunt, with his sons Charles Jr. and Harry T., kept the circus on the road from mid-April to October by truck and trailer, staging one-day stands from Florida to Maine, mostly between Richmond and Boston. They noted they were among the first to use flame-proof tents, aluminum poles, and other safety devices. Phil Wirth of the May Wirth troupe served as the ringmaster and equestrian director from 1937 to the 1950s.

Between 1942 and 1978, Hunt Bros. maintained their winter quarters in Florence Township, New Jersey. The Hunts wintered on 12 acres in three houses, storing their animals and equipment nearby. Through the off-season, they refurbished gear, performed at indoor shows, or traveled with the always-booked Hunt elephants.

The three-ring circus in 1949 was still headed by Charles T. Hunt, aided by sons Charlie, the equestrian director and superintendent; Harry, the manager and band leader; and Eddie, the youngest, an all-around star performer.

The Hunt Bros. Circus winter quarters were opened in 1954 as an educational attraction, featuring lectures, animal training demonstrations, and audience participation with domestic animals. Admission was 35 cents, with group rates available. Originally planned as a larger project, the program was reduced after Harry Hunt's hospitalization and the sudden death of his brother Eddie. To bolster management, outside executives were hired, while winter activities continued, including TV appearances by the circus's Liberty horses and elephants on CBS's Big Top.

The 1954 season opened with a tent in its third year of use, its durability credited to linen-thread stitching, while a new top would wait until the spring rains had passed. Aluminum quarter poles were already in service, and the latest alloy center poles from the Aluminum Company of America, under 300 pounds each, were light enough for two men to manage.

In 1955, during its 63rd season, the circus became the first to use a helicopter as an advertising medium. Its 1955 program featured wire acts, bareback riding, jugglers, Risley performers, aerialists, and clowns. The animal acts included eight elephants and expanded its lineup that year with trained animals such as a camel, Abyssinian horses, and llamas.

The Hunt Bros. Circus passed to Charles Jr., Harry T., and Edward Hunt following their father's tenure. In June 1956, following the withdrawal of Ringling Bros. and Barnum & Bailey Circus from touring, it became the longest-running American circus owned by a single family.

The show played Palisades Amusement Park in New Jersey in 1958 as Hamid-Morton & Hunt Bros. Combined Circus.

The Hunt Bros. Circus, by the early 1960s, operated with 52 semi-trailer trucks and more than 350 performers.

The death of Charles Hunt Jr. in 1963 and Harry Hunt's minor heart ailment convinced him the circus could not keep traveling. He established permanent quarters on family-owned land, operated a small zoo, and rented animals for commercials and public appearances.

== Alternate names ==
- Hunt Brothers Circus
- Hunt Bros. Three Ring Circus
- Hunt's Circus
- Hunt Brothers Circus and Wild West Show
- Hunt Bros. Circus Farm

== See also ==
- List of circuses and circus owners
