= Coogee, New South Wales =

Coogee
- Suburb
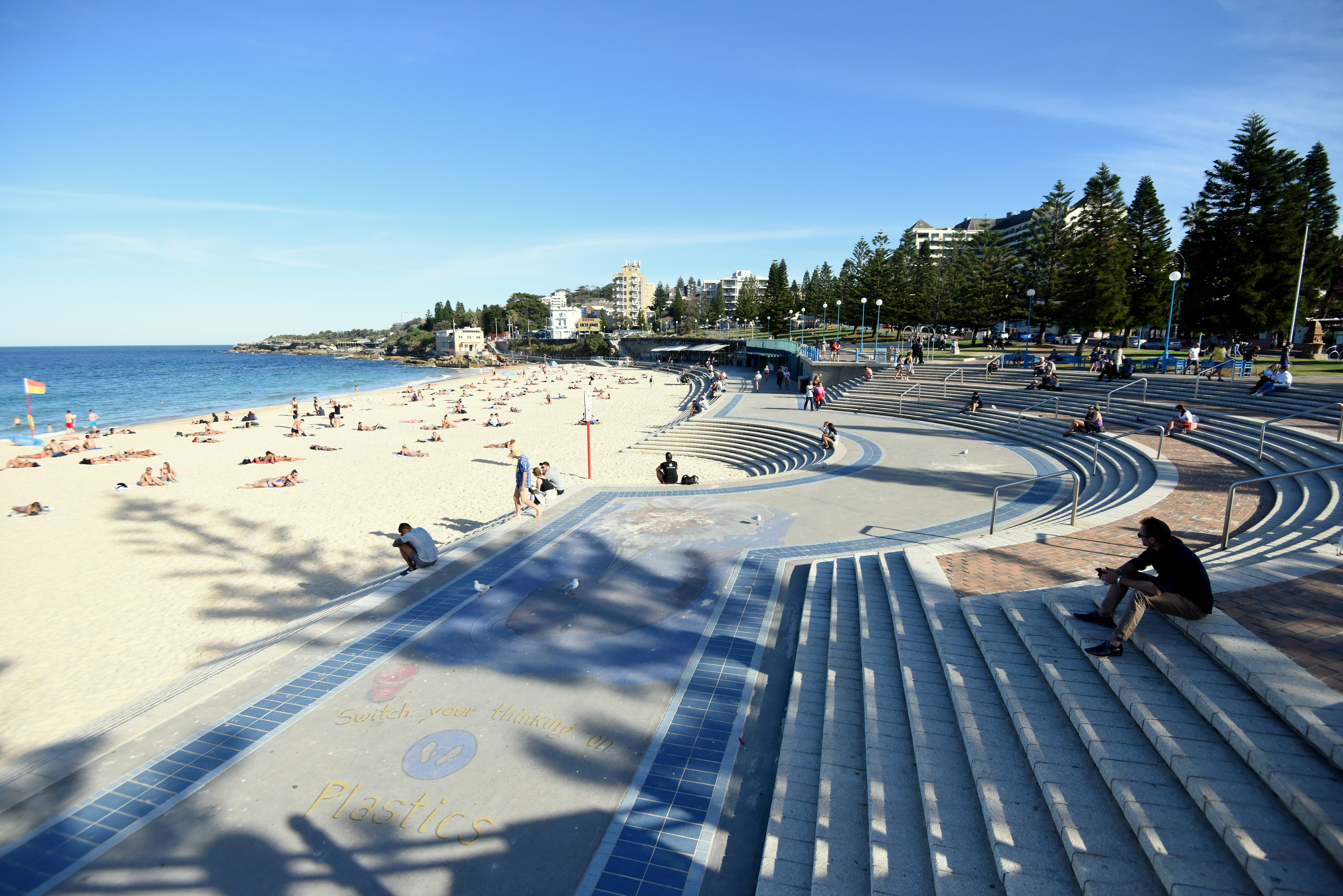
- Coogee Beach

- Interactive map of Coogee
- Country: Australia
- State: New South Wales
- City: Sydney
- LGA: City of Randwick
- Location: 8 km (5.0 mi) south-east of Sydney CBD
- Established: 1838

Government
  - State electorate: Coogee
  - Federal divisions: Kingsford Smith; Wentworth

Area
  - Total: 1.9 km^{2} (0.73 sq mi)
- Elevation: 27 m (89 ft)

Population
  - Total: 14,634 (2021 census)
  - Density: 7,700/km^{2} (19,900/sq mi)
- Postcode: 2034
Suburbs around Coogee
Charing Cross	Clovelly
Randwick	Coogee	Tasman Sea
Maroubra	South Coogee

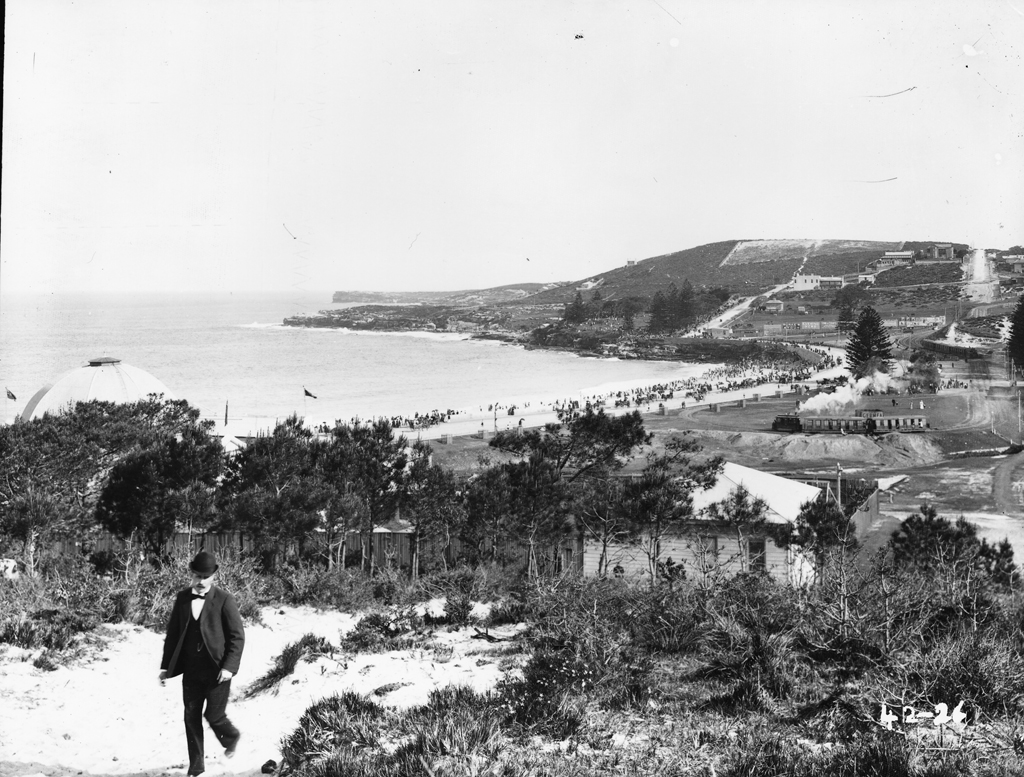
Coogee 1900

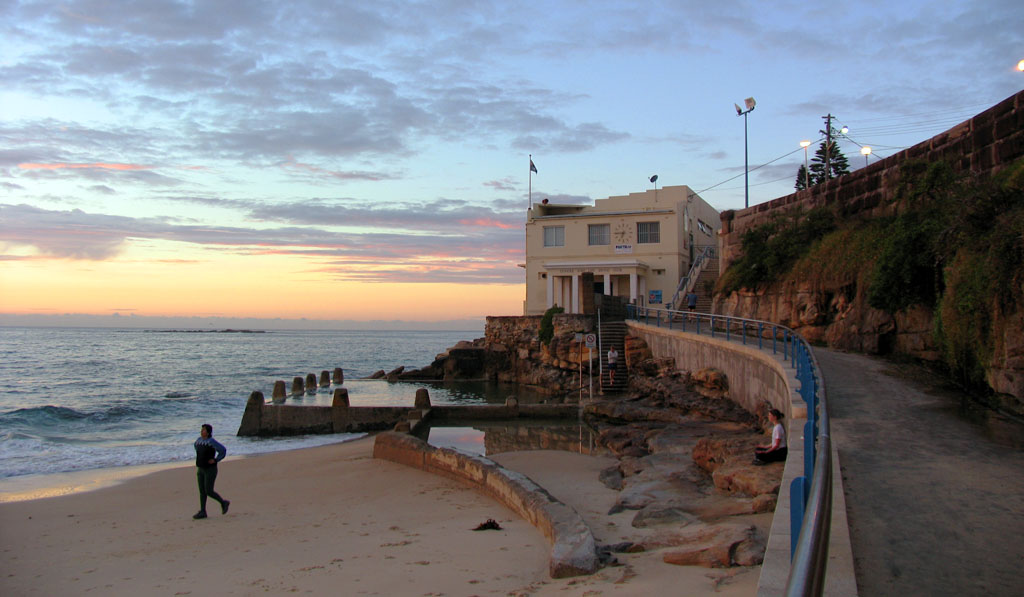
Coogee Surf Club

Coogee (/ˈkʊdʒi/) is a beachside suburb in the Eastern Suburbs of Sydney, New South Wales, Australia, eight kilometres south-east of the Sydney central business district.

The Tasman Sea and Coogee Bay along with Coogee Beach lie towards the eastern side of the suburb. The boundaries of Coogee are formed mainly by Clovelly Road, Carrington Road and Rainbow Street, with arbitrary lines drawn to join these thoroughfares to the coast in the north-east and south-east corners.

== History ==
=== Aboriginal ===
The name Coogee is said to be taken from a local Aboriginal word koojah which means "smelly place". Another version is koo-chai or koo-jah, both of which mean "the smell of the seaweed drying" in the Bidigal language, or "stinking seaweed", a reference to the smell of decaying kelp washed up on the beach. Early visitors to the area, from the 1820s onwards, were never able to confirm exactly what "Coogee" meant, or if it in fact related to Coogee Beach. Some evidence suggests that the word "Coogee" may in fact be the original Aboriginal place name for the next bay to the north, now known as Gordons Bay. Another name, "Bobroi", was also recalled as the indigenous name for the locality.

The Aboriginal population had largely relocated by the mid-19th century after being decimated by disease and violent clashes with early settlers, though some Aboriginal people still live in the area today.

=== European settlement ===
Coogee was gazetted as a village in 1838. The first school was built in 1863, and the building was converted into the Coogee Bay Hotel in 1873. Three years later, Coogee Public School was established. Baths there were the only place swimming was permitted in daylight hours. Ocean swimming was not widely commented upon. In late 1887, Coogee Palace Aquarium and swimming baths were constructed. The Coogee Pleasure Pier, a large attraction including a theatre, restaurant and ballroom, was constructed in 1928, but was later demolished in 1934.

Coogee was connected to the City of Sydney by electric tram in 1902. The suburb's popularity as a seaside resort was then guaranteed. The line branched from the line to Clovelly at Darley Road in Randwick. It ran down King Street beside the Randwick Tram Workshops, then ran in its own reservation to Belmore Road. It then ran down Perouse Road, St Pauls Street, Carr Street and Arden Street before terminating in a balloon loop in Dolphin Street at Coogee Beach. It ran through several small tram reservations on its way down from Randwick to the beach. The line from Randwick to Coogee opened in 1883, and electric services were introduced in 1902. The line closed in 1960. It follows the current route of Transdev John Holland bus route 373. Sections of the disused tramways are now maintained by local residents as a community garden.

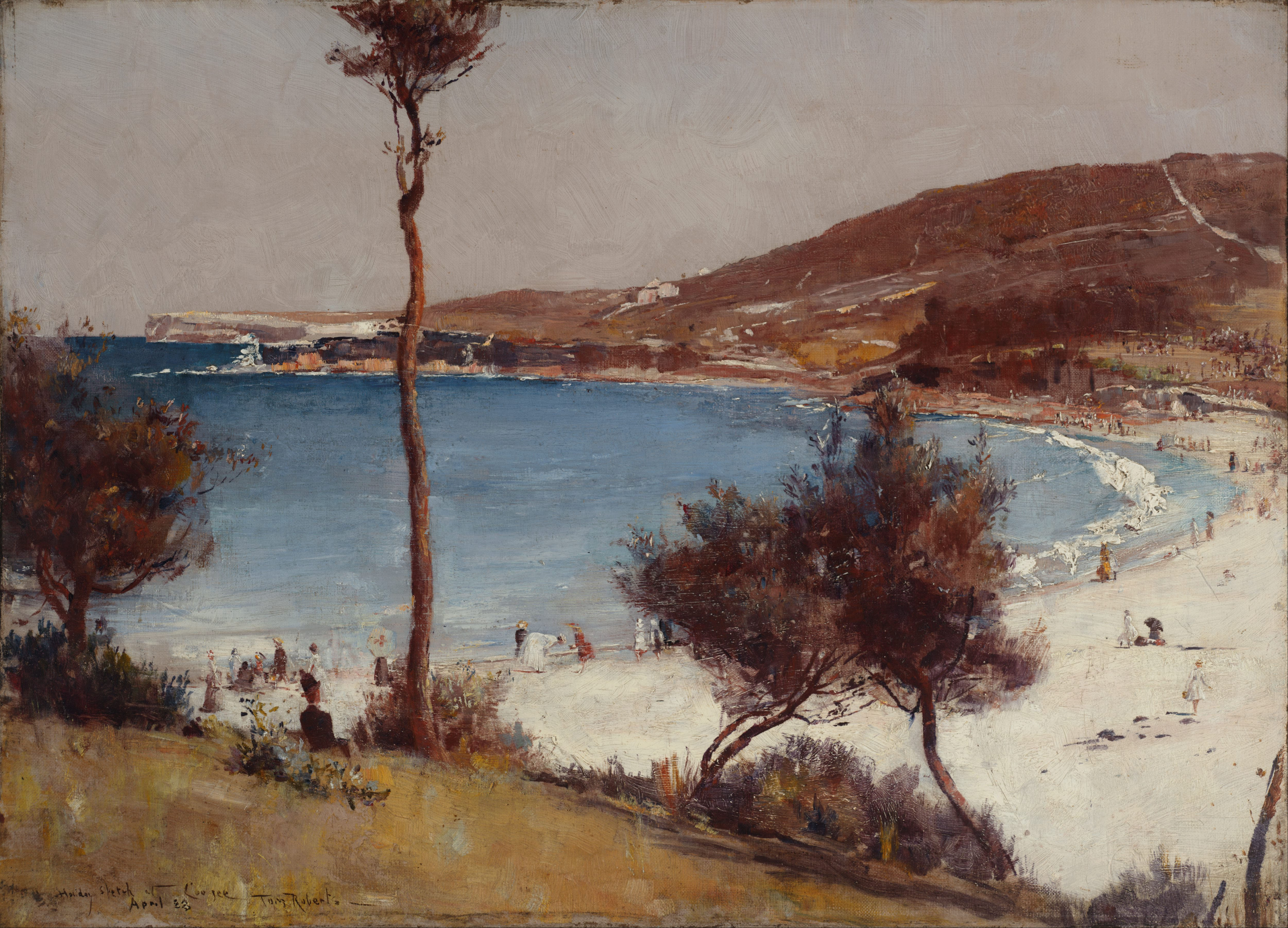
Tom Roberts, Holiday Sketch at Coogee, 1888

The 1888 paintings of Coogee Bay by Charles Conder and Tom Roberts are among the earliest masterpieces of the Heidelberg School or Australian impressionism.

The Coogee Surf Life Saving Club was founded in 1907 by local people who believed swimmers needed protection from the dangers of the surf. The CSLSC prides itself on being a pioneer in the realm of surf life saving. In fact, the first mass rescue, night surf carnival, shark attack and the development of the resuscitation technique are attributed to the CSLSC. In 2017 a lost-and-found room, first-aid room, kiosk, surf-board store room and amenities were finished building. It was closed in 2020 because of COVID-19 and but is now re-opened.

Built in the early 1890s and occupied by a Mrs T.M. Alcock was a large mansion known as Maidstone, which stands in Waltham Street beside St Brigid's Church. The house features a metal cupola and cedar fittings inside. The Catholic Church bought the building in 1922 and it was restored to its original style by Provincial House of the Missionaries of the Sacred Heart.

Located in Alison Road is a two-storey Federation mansion named Ocean View. The house was built in 1916 by Philip Wirth, of Wirth's Circus, and is heritage-listed. Other notable buildings in the area include Roslyn, a large Italianate house in Arcadia Street. It is heritage-listed.

=== Coogee Palace Aquarium (1887–1986) ===
The Coogee Aquarium and Swimming Baths were officially opened on 23 December 1887. It covered a block of land bordered by Arden Street, Beach Street, Bream Street, and Dolphin Street. The Palace included an indoor swimming pool (25 x 10 metres), an aquarium featuring the tiger shark from the famous Shark Arm case, a great hall that could be used as a roller skating rink, Canadian toboggan ran down the hillside for over 70 metres, and a herd of 14 donkeys to ride, as well as swings, whirligigs, rocking horses, toy boats, aviaries, flower beds, bandstand, and an open-air bar.

In June 1945, a strong storm caused the large dome to collapse. In 1987, the Coogee Palace and Dome was re-built and converted to restaurants and bars. The former hotel on the premises was owned by investment banker David Kingston and was known both as The Beach Palace Hotel and The Aquarium. In August 2014, the building re-opened as the Coogee Pavilion in a $30 million+ renovation by the Merivale group, and its director Justin Hemmes.

=== Eileen O'Connor and Our Lady's Nurses for the Poor (1913) ===
Eileen O'Connor, a devout but severely disabled young woman, met the first Catholic priest in charge of the Coogee parish, Fr Ted McGrath, in 1911. Together they determined to found an order of nurses dedicated to looking after the sick poor in their own homes. Despite the pain and partial paralysis from her spinal condition, O’Connor proved to be an indefatigable and intelligent organizer and teacher whose love and faith inspired her own and later generations of nurses. On 15 April 1913 in Coogee the pair co-founded Our Lady's Nurses for the Poor. A donor bought for them a house at 35 Dudley Street, Coogee, which, with extensions, still houses the order. Despite many difficulties from Church authorities the order was firmly established by the time of Eileen's death aged 28 in 1921. Under the leadership of Theresa (Cissie) McLaughlin and later superiors, it has continued to provide a range of services to those in need in inner Sydney and elsewhere. Eileen is buried in the Dudley Street property. The cause for her canonisation is under way and she is likely to become the second Australian canonised Catholic saint.

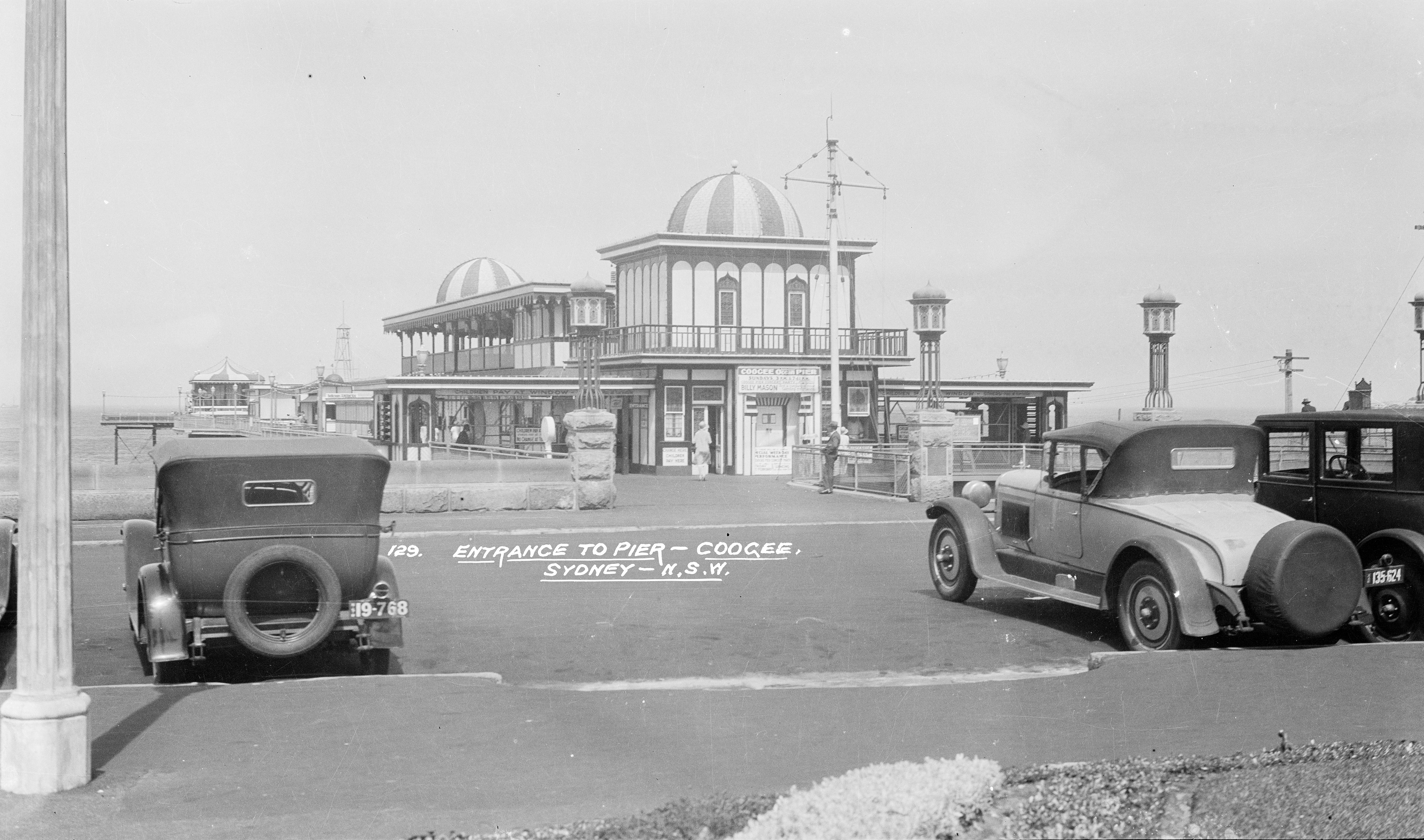
Coogee Pier, Sydney, 1928–34

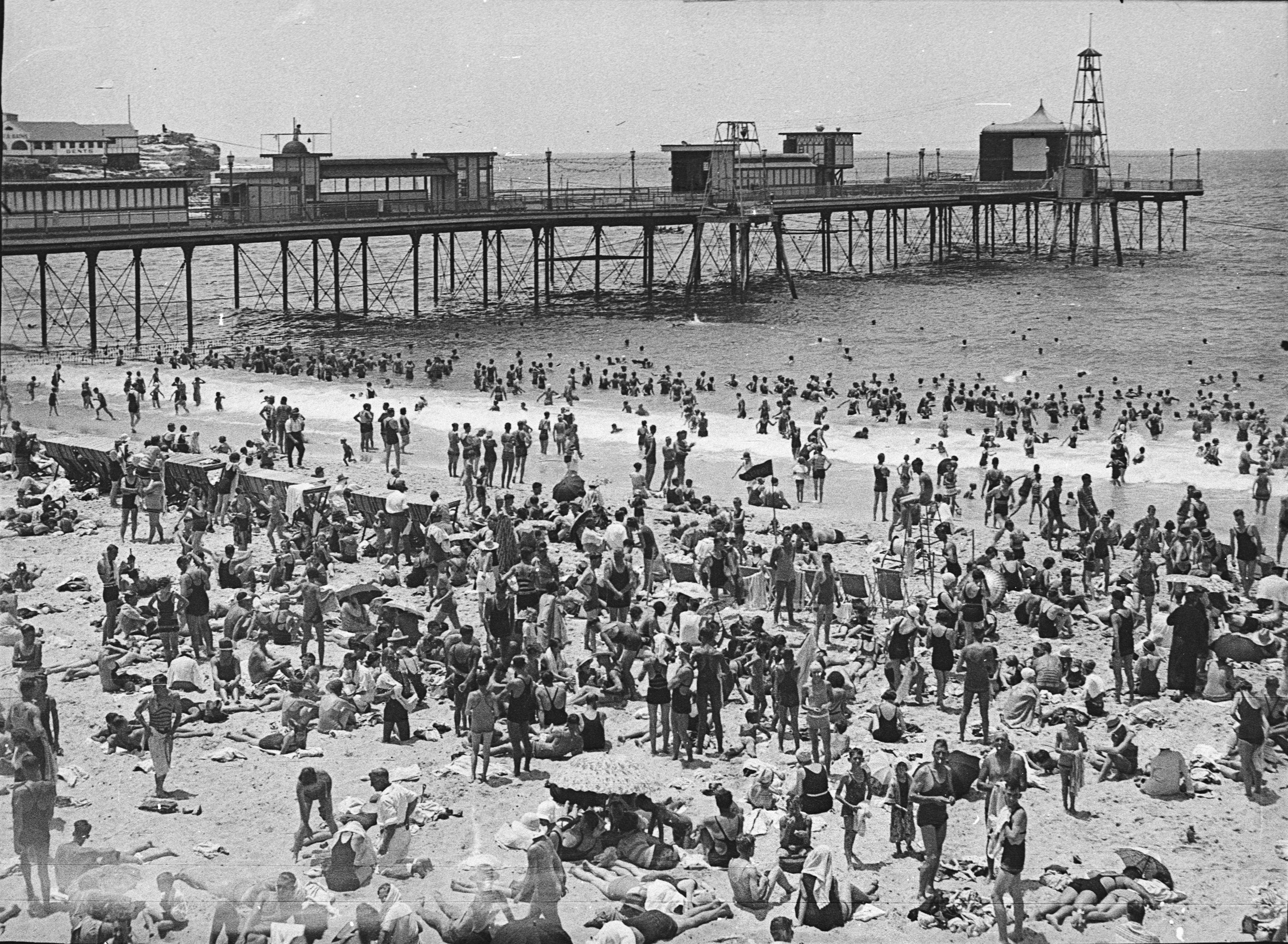
Coogee Pier

=== The Coogee Pier (1928–1934) ===
In 1924, construction started on an "English seaside style" amusement pier at Coogee Beach. On 24 July 1928, the pier was officially opened, reaching 180 metres out into the sea complete with a 1400-seat theatre, a 600 capacity ballroom, a 400-seat restaurant upstairs, small shops and a penny (machine) arcade. Unfortunately, Coogee's rough surf damaged the pier and it was demolished in 1934. Lifeguards recently discovered remains of the pier on the ocean floor about 50 metres out from shore.

=== Shark Arm murder case (1935) ===
The Shark Arm case was an incident at the Coogee Aquarium Baths in 1935, when a captured tiger shark regurgitated a human arm. The arm belonged to a missing person, James Smith, who was identified by a tattoo. The arm had been cut off, which led to a murder investigation. Nobody was ever charged over the murder, although another local criminal, Reginald Holmes, was found shot in a car near the Sydney Harbour Bridge the day before the inquest into Smith's death was due to start.

=== Alleged Marian apparition (2003) ===
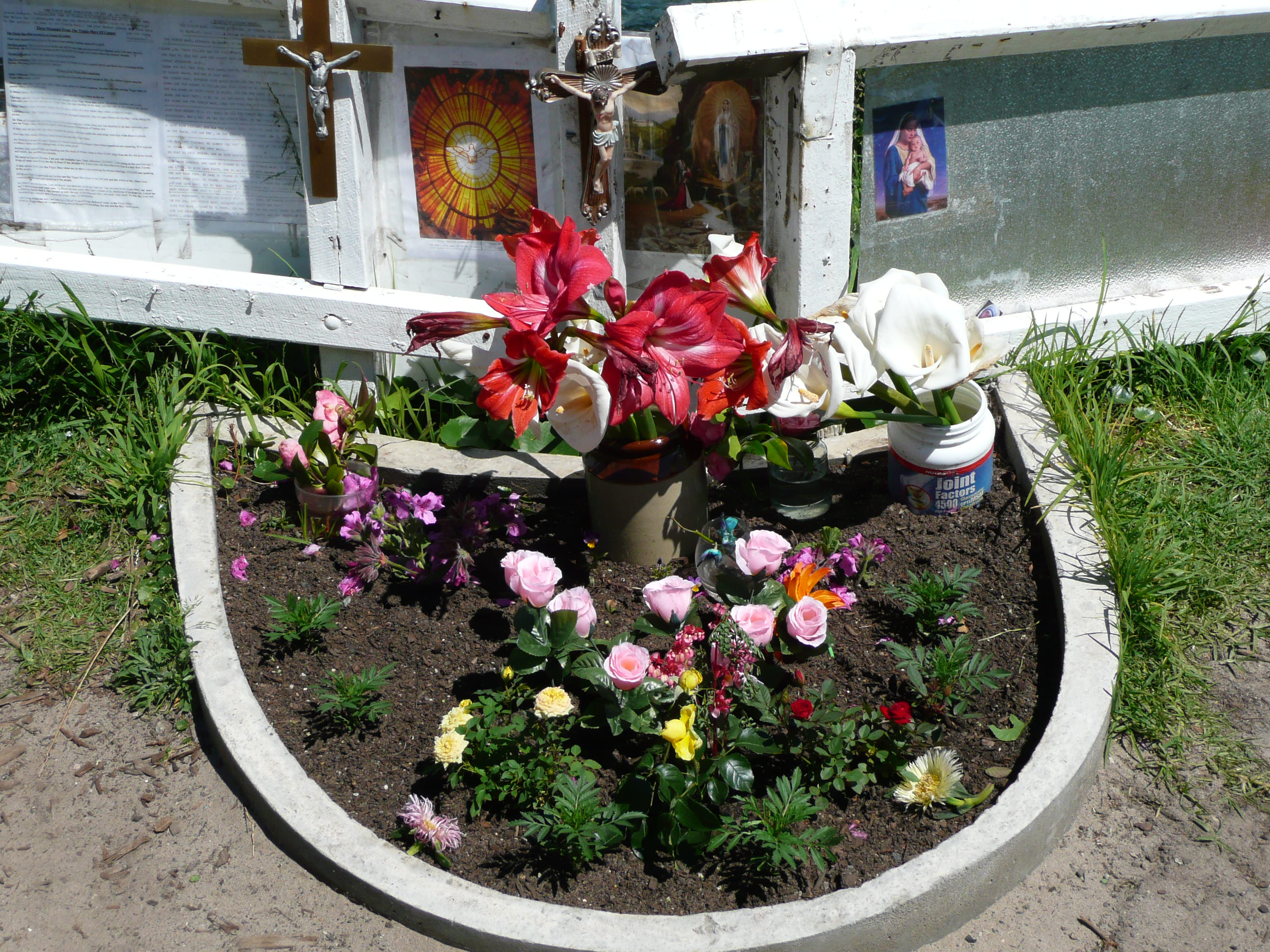
Makeshift shrine at site of "visions"

In January 2003, it was noticed that one of the fence rails on Dolphin Point, just north of Coogee Beach, when viewed from a particular angle and distance, resembled a veiled woman. A local laundrette was one of the first to draw attention to it, and set up a gallery of photos to attract visiting "pilgrims".

When this example of pareidolia, a human tendency to perceive vague visual stimuli as human faces, was reported in newspapers many Christians (predominantly Roman Catholic) came daily to worship what they interpreted as an apparition of Mary, the mother of Jesus, although the Roman Catholic Church never officially recognised this alleged apparition.

No particular supernatural powers were attributed to the shadow (dubbed "Our Lady of the Fence Post" by the media, aka "Rail Mary") and interest waned within a few weeks. The section of fence that created the image was destroyed by vandals within days of it being publicised, although the local council had the fence replaced. While some continued to petition the Catholic Church and the New South Wales government to build a chapel, their claims were not seriously considered.

== Heritage listings ==
Coogee has a number of heritage-listed sites, including:

- 45–51 Beach Street: Cliffbrook
- Grant Reserve: McIver Women's Baths
- 4b Neptune Street: Wylie's Baths
- St Brigid's Catholic Church

== Transport ==
Sydney's steam tramways first reached Coogee in 1883 and were electrified in 1902. The trams were replaced by buses from time to time in the 1940s and 1950s as the infrastructure suffered severe neglect during and after World War II. The tracks were deemed too expensive to repair and the power supply was so inadequate that trams would grind to a halt in inconvenient locations. Eventually, the entire Sydney tram network was scrapped and replaced by buses. The last trams ran to Coogee in 1960.

There are usually many taxis in the area and there is a late night taxi rank on Friday and Saturday nights just behind the main bus stand on Arden Street. The suburb is now well served by buses; there is a bus interchange at the beach with three stands. The following outlines routes and their stands.

Main Stand – Arden Street near Coogee Beach (Eastern Side)

- 313: Bondi Junction station via Carrington Road
- 350: Sydney Airport via Maroubra and Westfield Eastgardens
- 370: Glebe Point via Newtown
- 373: Museum railway station via Taylor Square
- X73: Museum station – Express

North Stand – Arden Street near Dolphin Street (Eastern Side)

- 374: Central station
- X74: Museum station – Express

Oval Stand – Arden Street near Dolphin Street (Western Side)

- 350: Bondi Junction station via Clovelly and Waverley
- 362: Rose Bay wharf via Bronte (October–April weekends only)

== Geography and landmarks ==
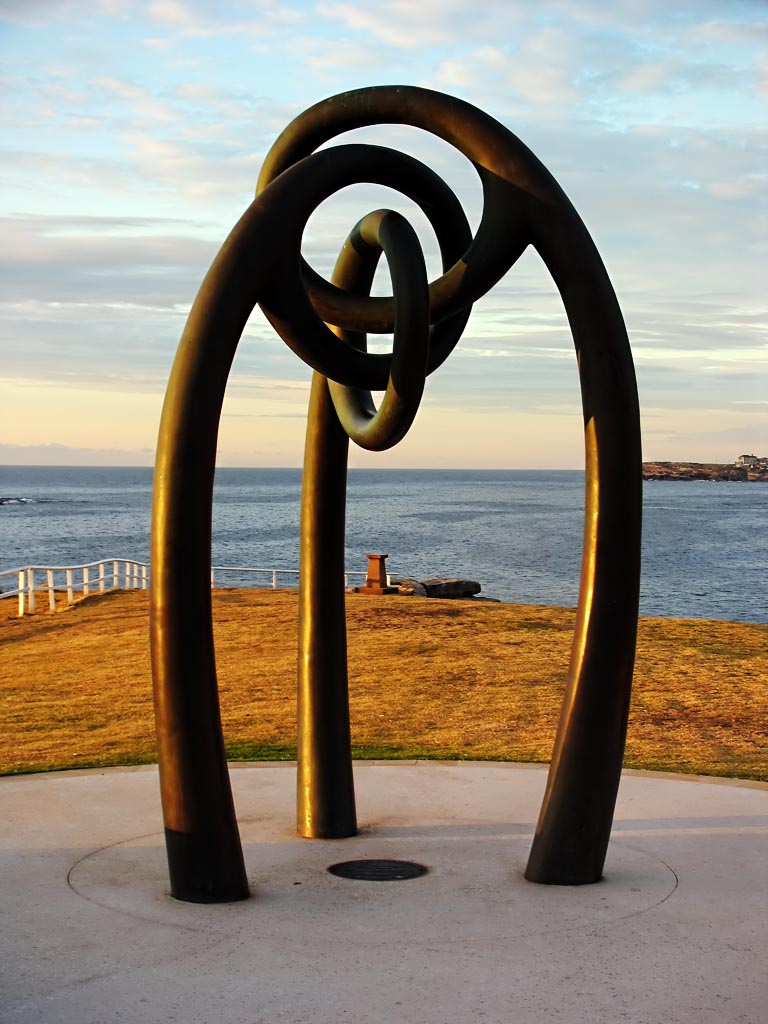
Bali bombing memorial at Dolphin Point

Coogee Bay Road runs from Randwick to Coogee Beach which is relatively protected through its formation as a bay. The surrounding coastline is mostly cliffs, decreasing in height down to the beach in the western part of the bay. The bay is sheltered from the roughest seas by Wedding Cake Island, a rocky reef about 800m off the southern headland. There is an bi-annual swimming event around the island, normally in November & April.

The beach itself drops off rapidly at the edge of the water, which can result in a dangerous shore break particularly when the surf is large. The combination of this shore break and high visitor numbers mean that Coogee has more spinal injuries than any other Australian beach.

In larger surf, there are often rip currents at both the northern end and at the southern ends, and also quite frequently in the centre of the beach. These are simply the places where the incoming water escapes most naturally. It is claimed by some locals that the rip in the centre of the beach is partly caused by the remaining foundations of the old entertainment pier (see above – history).

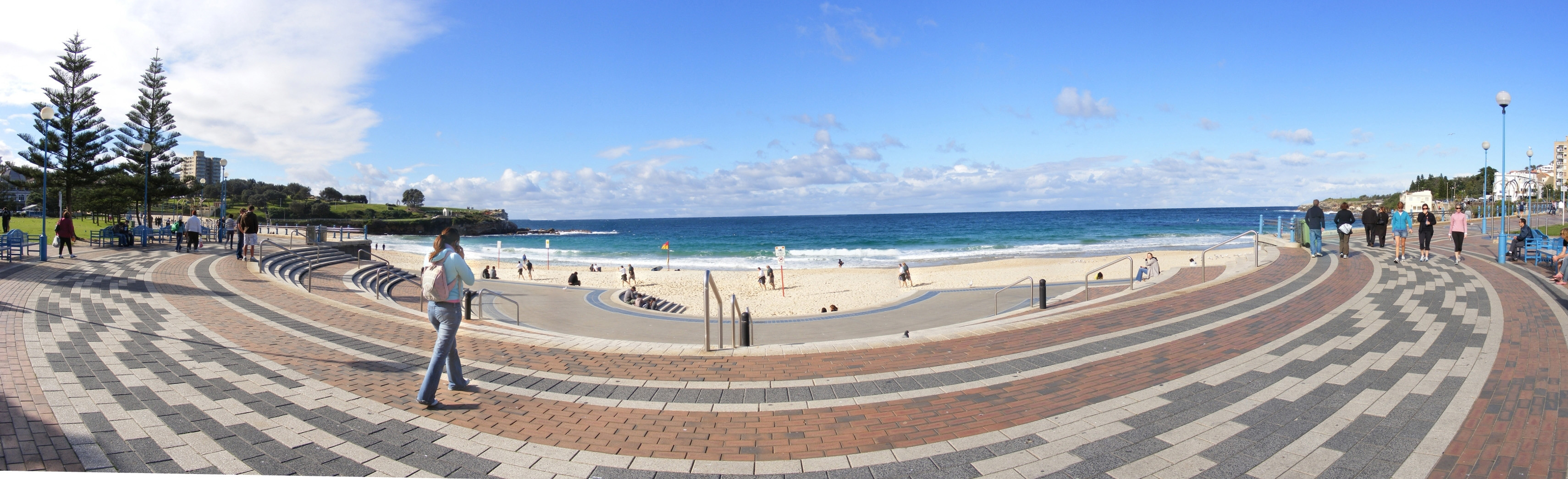
Coogee Beach

At the northern end of the beach are stairs leading from Dolphin Point down to the old Giles baths. This is now an open rock pool carved out of the surrounding rocks. This area is now known as "Dolphin Point". The doorway and a four-metre high bronze sculpture serve as a memorial to twenty of the Australian victims of the 2002 Bali bombing who were residents of Coogee and its neighbouring suburbs, including six members of the Coogee Dolphins rugby league team.

A short walk further to the north is Gordons Bay, which is a popular location for snorkeling. At the southern end is the Ross Jones Memorial Pool just below the Coogee Surf Life Saving Club. Also at the southern end are two small reefs, the inner and the outer. Further south is a coastal walk that goes past the women's baths and Wylie's Baths.

Coogee is one of Australia's more densely populated areas, with apartment buildings in every style from the 1930s onwards. Some free-standing houses remain.

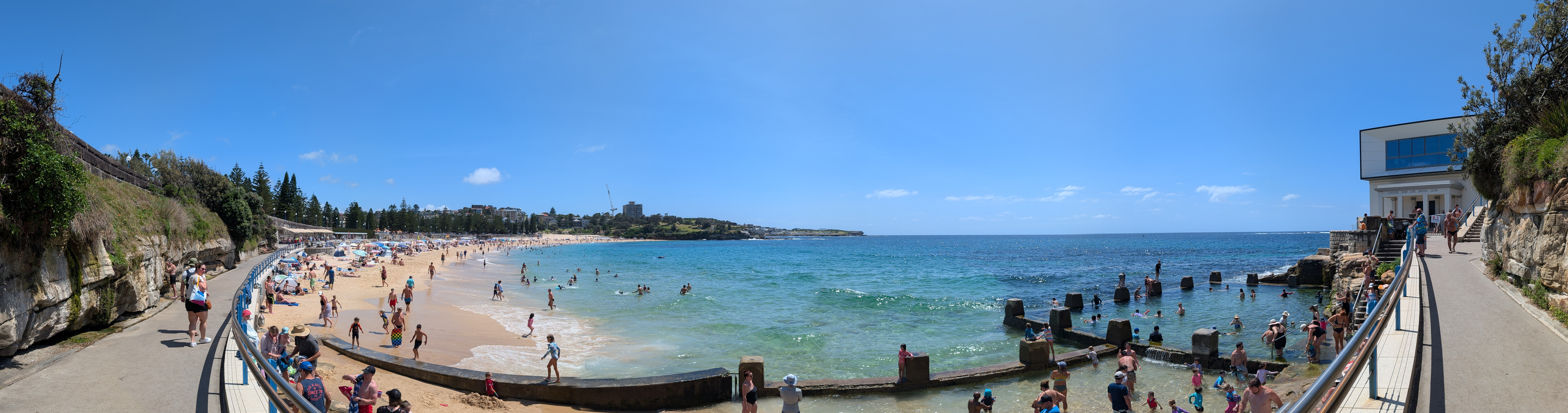
Panoramic view of the Ross Jones Memorial Pool (right) at Coogee Beach

== Demographics ==
Historical population
Year	Pop.	±%
2001	13,398	—
2006	13,179	−1.6%
2011	14,012	+6.3%
2016	15,212	+8.6%
2021	14,634	−3.8%

At the 2021 census, there were 14,634 residents in Coogee.

The most common ancestries in Coogee were English 36.2%, Australian 22.8%, Irish 19.5%, Scottish 10.0% and Italian 4.9%. 56.4% of people were born in Australia. The next most common countries of birth were England 9.9%, Ireland 4.5%, New Zealand 2.6%, United States of America 1.9% and Brazil 1.6%. 79% of people only spoke English at home. Other languages spoken at home included French 1.9%, Spanish 1.9%, Greek 1.3%, Portuguese 1.6% and German 1.1%.

The most common responses for religion were No Religion, so described 48.1% and Catholic 25.4%.

== Sport and recreation ==
In the NRL Coogee is represented by the Sydney Roosters and has been since the original articles of association were outlined in 1908 despite junior league clubs being shifted in the later half of the 20th century.

Randwick District Rugby Union Football Club resides in Brook Street, Coogee and plays their home games across the road at Coogee Oval. Randwick currently competes in all grades of the New South Wales Rugby Shute Shield competition.

Coogee United Football Club is one of the largest football clubs in the Eastern Suburbs of Sydney, with Senior teams, Coogee White Tigers Football Club is known as the local football development club training youth player age 3years to 15 years old as is also well as international football partners with Celtic FC Glasgow Scotland.

Coogee Surf Life Saving Club has competed in both branch and state as well as national competitions since its founding in 1907, and continues a strong presence in all three areas of competition today. The club surf carnival is held annually in February each year. The Surf Club fosters and supports many other water-oriented sport and recreation club's including the Coogee Minnows (a junior lifesaving/nipper club), Coogee Triathlon Club, The Coogee Boardriders as well as supporting swimming groups such as the Coogee Penguins. The nearby Wylie's Baths, an historic coastal pool facility, has been a longtime supporter of Coogee's water-based sports and recreation.

The Coogee Penguins Winter Swimming Club compete against Bondi Icebergs Winter Swimming Club, South Maroubra Dolphins Winter Swimming Club, Cronulla Polar Bears Winter Swimming Club, Maroubra Seals Winter Swimming Club, Coolangatta Surf Life Saving Club, Clovelly Eskimos Winter Swimming Club, Bronte Splashers, Wollongong Whales and Cottesloe Crabs in the Winter Swimming Association of Australia Championships

Beach volleyball is growing in popularity around the world. The Coogee Beach Volleyball Association resides at the northern end of the beach, with the Council authorisation to set up five portable nets along the promenade.

The popular beachside pub, the Coogee Bay Hotel used to have a junior club with the Sydney Roosters affiliated 'Eastern Suburbs District Junior Rugby League' (ESDJRL).

== Schools ==
Coogee has two primary schools. Coogee Public School is a grades K–6 primary school at the corner of Byron Street and Coogee Bay Road, established 1876. St Brigid's Catholic Primary School is a grades K–6 primary school on Coogee Bay Road, established 1923.

== Places of worship ==
Places of worship in Coogee include:

- St Brigid's Catholic Church, a Catholic parish church on the corner of Brook and Waltham Streets.
- St Nicholas' Anglican Church, an Anglican parish on Brook Street founded in 1887.
- Coogee Synagogue, a synagogue within walking distance of the beach, founded on its present site in 1960 by a group of Holocaust survivors.

== Festivals and events ==
- The Coogee Arts Festival in February is a series of open-air events held in the parklands above the southern side of Coogee Beach. It features theatre performances and a small film festival.
- The Annual Coogee Family Fun Day is the first Saturday of every December, held by the Coogee Chamber of Commerce. It features amusement rides and stalls next to the beach.
- Coogee Carols are held on the weekend prior to Christmas at Goldstein Reserve, opposite Coogee Beach. The event has been staged annually since 2002.
- Coogee Sparkles are a New Year's Eve event held at 9pm on the evening of 31 December – prominent vantage points include Goldstein Reserve (opposite Coogee Beach) and on the sand of Coogee Beach.
- Putu Mayam Day is the first of its kind outside of Malaysia. On the first of every month one can indulge in the world-famous putu mayam (rice noodles accompanied by shaved coconut and brown sugar) on the coastal edge of Coogee Beach.
- Coogee Dawn Service is held on Anzac Day at Coogee Beach annually. The service is held at dawn.
- The Island Challenge, held in the last weekend in November by the Coogee Surf Life Saving Club, involves a 2.4 km swim out and around Wedding Cake Island (off Coogee Beach). The race began in 2000, attracts hundreds of competitors, and is a prominent fixture on the Sydney ocean swimming scene. Participants may also compete in a 1 km shorter swim, and for participants under the age of 12, an 800m dash is also held.

== Notable people ==
- Ward Austin, radio DJ
- Glenn A. Baker, journalist and broadcaster
- Richie Benaud, cricketer and commentator
- Samuel Bennett, journalist and historian
- Hugh Bowman, jockey
- Daryl Braithwaite, singer
- Frank Browne, journalist
- Shawn Budd, snooker and pool player
- Ron Casey, broadcaster
- Michael Cheika, rugby union and rugby league coach
- Molly Contogeorge, musician
- Catherine Gaskin, novelist
- Keith Gordon, rugby union player
- Minnie Hooper, dance instructor
- Nell Hall Hopman, tennis player
- George Howell, soldier
- David Knox, rugby union coach
- Eileen Kramer, dancer and choreographer
- Dennis Kuchar, cardiologist
- Richard Lane, author
- Betty Lucas, actress
- Bruce Notley-Smith, politician
- Nicholas Shehadie, former Lord Mayor of Sydney and rugby union player
- James Joynton Smith, hotelier and former Lord Mayor of Sydney
- Alan Stevens, Australian Rules player
- Bud Tingwell, actor
- Peter van Onselen, academic and journalist
- Angela Webber, author and comedian
- Mina Wylie, Olympic swimmer
- Nick Blakey, AFL footballer
- John Blakey, AFL footballer/coach

== Politics ==
Coogee is part of the City of Randwick, forming the East Ward together with Clovelly. It lies in the Federal electorate of Kingsford Smith (which covers all of south-east Sydney), historically Coogee has been part of the Wentworth and then the Phillip electorates.

Coogee is located in the State electorate of Coogee (which also includes the suburbs of Randwick, Waverley, Clovelly, Bronte, and Bondi Junction). Coogee is currently represented by the Australian Labor Party at both the Federal level and the State level.

== See also ==
- Bondi Beach
- Bronte Beach
