= Muston Park =

Park in New South Wales, Australia

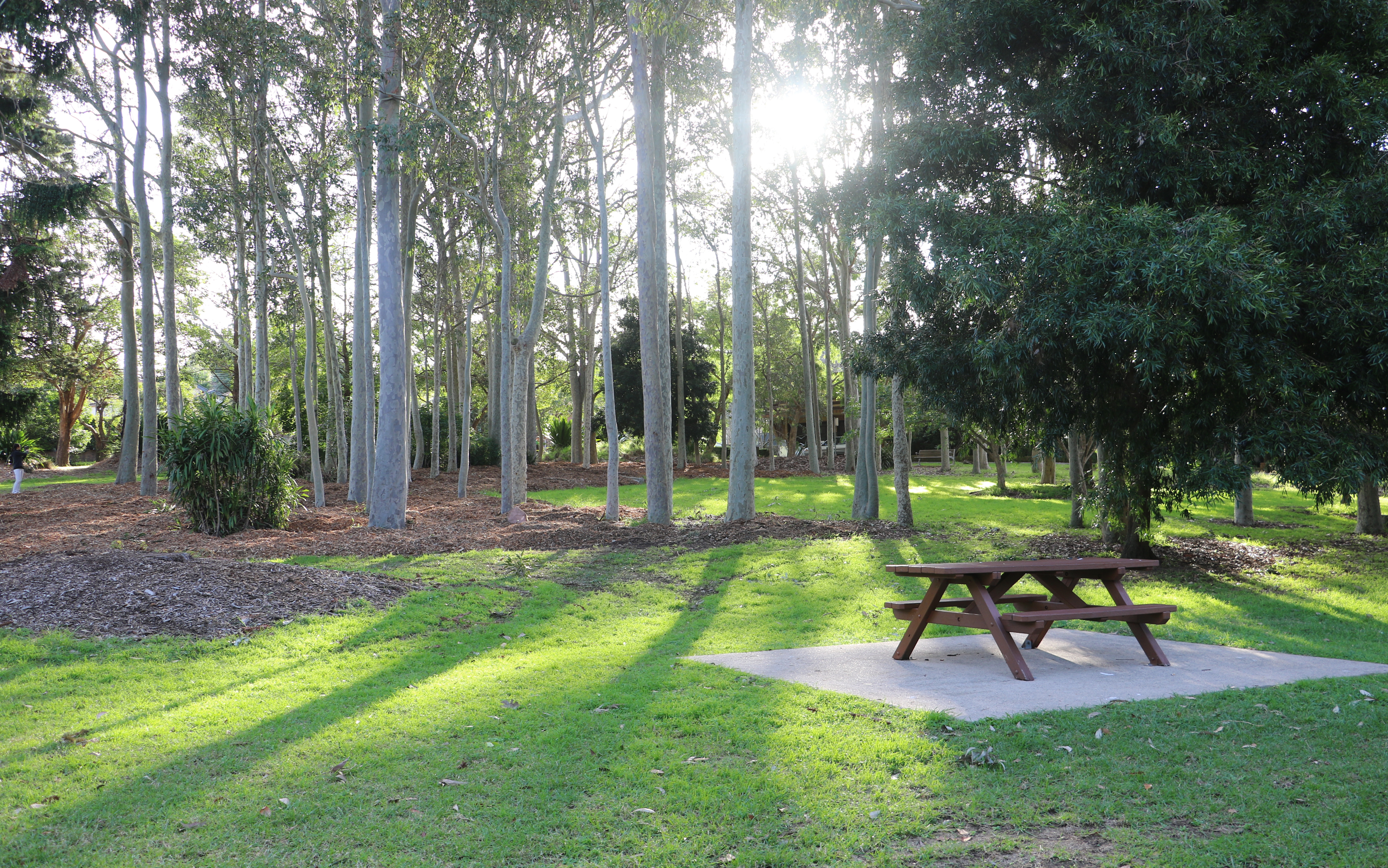
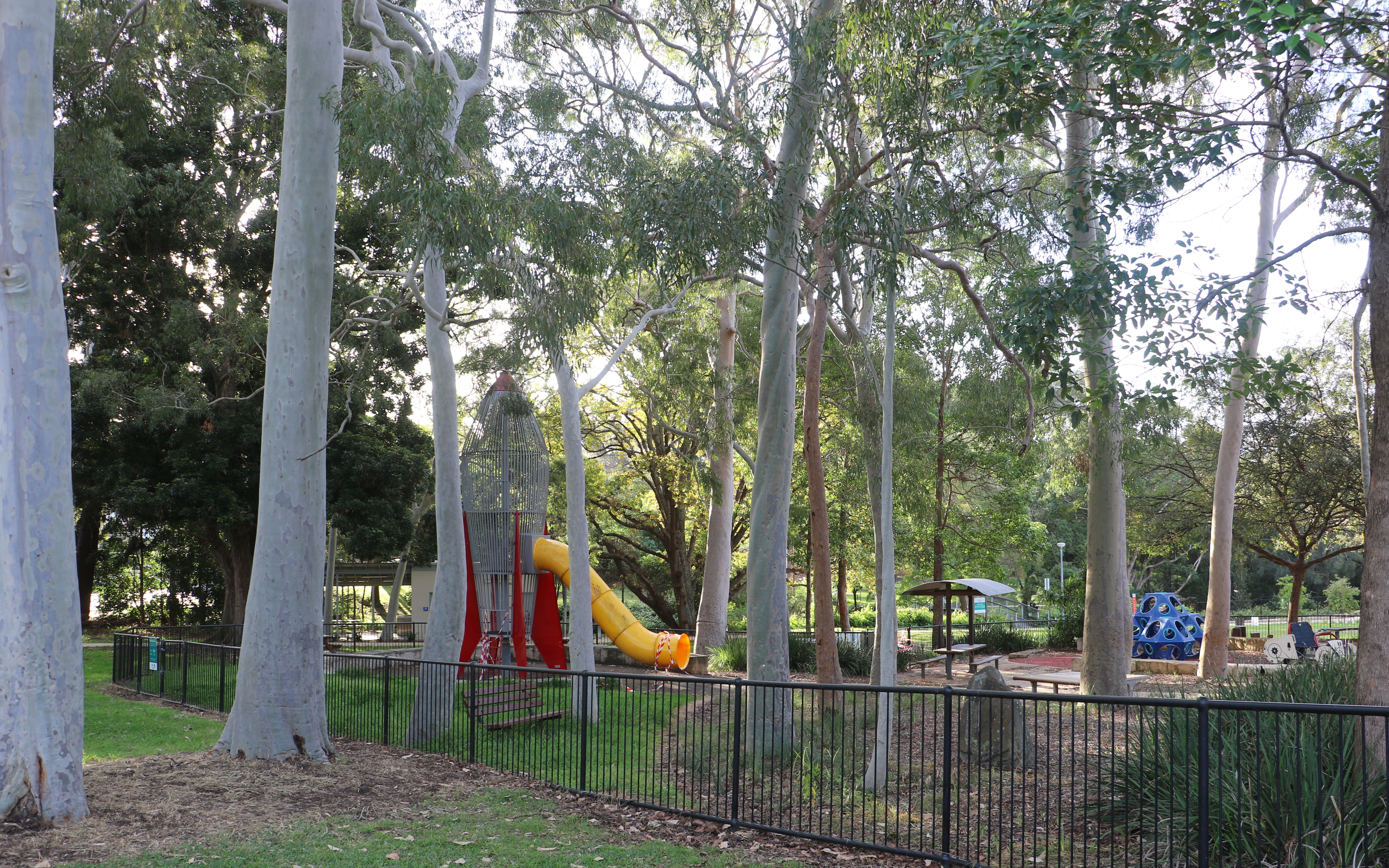
- King George VI Memorial Grove Queen Elizabeth II Grove

- Location within Sydney
- Interactive map of Muston Park
- Type: Urban park
- Location: Chatswood, Sydney, New South Wales, Australia
- Coordinates: 33°47′20″S 151°11′41″E
- Area: 2.0186 ha (4.988 acres)
- Elevation: 70 m (230 ft) AHD
- Established: circa 1880; 146 years ago
- Etymology: William Thomas Muston
- Operator: City of Willoughby
- Status: Open
- Website: willoughby.nsw.gov.au

Muston Park is a 2-hectare (5-acre) urban park situated in the suburb of Chatswood, approximately 7 kilometres (4 mi) north of the Sydney central business district, in New South Wales, Australia.

== History ==
The local indigenous Australian people, the Cammeraygal occupied this area for at least 5,800 years. The park is named after William Thomas Muston, the original European owner of the land and Mayor of Willoughby in 1890. His house 'Penshurst' stood in the middle of the area and was sold in 1921. By 1938 cows were still grazing in the park. Circuses performed here, such as Sole Brother's Circus in 1939 and Wirth's Circus in 1942. In the second world war, parts of the park were used by the military.

In 1952, plantations of gum trees were created, named King George VI Memorial Grove in the north made of Spotted Gums, and Queen Elizabeth II Grove in the south near the children's playground composed of the similar looking Lemon scented gums. At the same time, the Wisteria walkway was created.

== Geography ==
Average annual rainfall is 1,200 mm (47 in) at Chatswood Bowling Club. Soils are moderately fertile, based on a transitional zone between the Hawkesbury sandstone and Ashfield Shale. Originally the area would have supported Blue Gum High Forest, but no original trees remain.

The oldest trees in the park probably date from the 1880s, when Muston Park was part of a pleasure ground known as Royal Park. They include a camphor laurel, bunya pine, hoop pine, white booyong, Moreton Bay fig and an oak.

== Wildlife ==
Pacific black ducks, sulfur-crested cockatoos, water dragons and brush turkeys are some of the creatures seen in the park.

== See also ==
- Parks in Sydney
