= Wirths =

Wirths is a German surname. Notable people with the surname include:

- Carl Wirths (1897–1955), German politician
- Eduard Wirths (1909–1945), Nazi German SS doctor at Auschwitz concentration camp during World War II
- Günter Wirths (1911–2005), German chemist
- Harold J. Wirths, American politician from New Jersey
- Wallace R. Wirths (1921–2002), American business executive, author, newspaper columnist and radio commentator, and benefactor of Upsala College

== See also ==
- Wirth, a surname
