= Keith Gordon (rugby union) =

Australian rugby player (1927–1998)

- Born: Keith Milton Gordon; 29 April 1927 Coogee, New South Wales, Australia
- Died: 5 June 1998 (aged 71)

Rugby union career
- Position: prop
International career
Years	Team	Apps	(Points)
1950	Wallabies	2	(0)

Keith Milton Gordon (29 April 1927 – 5 June 1998) was a rugby union player who represented Australia.

Gordon, a prop, was born in Coogee, New South Wales and claimed a total of two international rugby caps for Australia. He attended Sydney Boys High School, playing alongside fellow Wallaby Saxon White, he graduated in 1946.

Gordon died on 5 June 1998, at the age of 71.
