= Norma Bull =

Australian artist (1906–1980)

- Born: 7 September 1906; Melbourne
- Died: September 1980; Melbourne
- Education: National Gallery of Victoria Art School
- Known for: Painting, drawing

Norma Catherine Bull (7 September 1906 – September 1980) was an Australian painter, printmaker and etcher, best known for the paintings and sketches she made in Britain during World War II.

== Early life ==
Bull was born and grew up in Melbourne, where her father was the director of bacteriology at Melbourne University In 1932, she graduated from the National Gallery of Victoria Art School, having won numerous prizes and scholarships during her time as a student. In 1934, she sold two works to the Melbourne Art Gallery and, in the same year, the poet John Masefield agreed to sit for her whilst visiting Melbourne. The resulting etched portrait was shown at the Royal Academy in 1940.

== World War Two ==
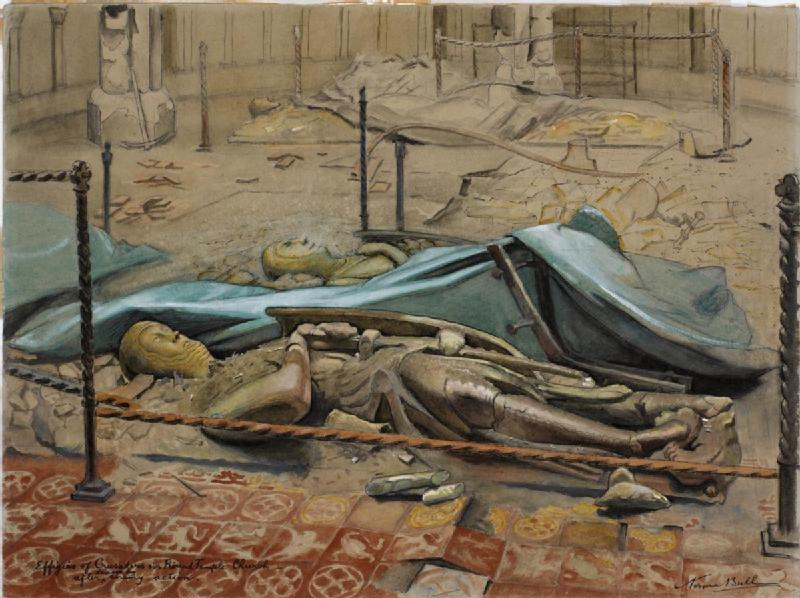
Effigies of Crusaders in Temple Church, London, after damage by enemy action. (Art. IWM ART LD 4899)

Bull moved to England to widen her artistic experience, arriving in London in April 1939. When the World War II was declared in September that year, Bull volunteered for civil defence work. She worked as a volunteer at a First Aid Clearing Station near Oxford, where she received training in first aid and fire fighting. She went on to train other volunteers at a first aid post in Somerset, and helped with evacuees and did fire-watching shifts in Bath. Early in 1941, supported by a recommendation from John Masefield, Bull contacted the War Artists' Advisory Committee (WAAC), offering her services as an artist. In February 1941, she was given a sketching permit to record bomb damage in Bristol. An exhibition of her drawings was held in at the Harris Gallery in Bath in 1941.

When some of the sketches were published in Australian newspapers, the BBC asked Bull to make a number of radio broadcasts to Australia. In August 1942, whilst staying in Bournemouth, she asked to sketch at the Observer Corps post on Canford Cliffs and, despite permission from the Officer Commanding of the post, the Chief Constable of Dorset complained about her presence and Bull temporarily lost her sketching permit. As well as bomb damage in Bath and Bristol, her wartime subjects included Chelsea Pensioners, children helping with the harvest and searchlights illuminating St Paul's Cathedral on the night of V-E Day.

Three of Bull's painting, including one of the bomb damage to the Temple Church in London, were purchased by the WAAC for between eight and ten guineas each. In 1947, an exhibition of her wartime work was held at Australia House in London. The show was well reviewed and the Queen attended and bought nine paintings, which remain in the Royal Collection. A similar exhibition of Bull's work, entitled Great Britain in Wartime, toured Australia for several years after the war.

== Later life ==
After the war, Bull returned to Australia where she continued her career as an artist. She spent twelve months travelling around the country with Wirth's Circus, painting scenes of circus life. She then returned to Melbourne to live in her childhood home, Medlow, in Surrey Hills. As well as painting and teaching art, Bull served as the secretary of the Fellowship of Australian Artists from 1960. She painted landscapes and seascapes, often at her holiday homes in Anglesea and Bright. She was a nature lover and promoted forest conservation.
