= Wirth Lake =

Wirth Lake may refer to:

- Walter Wirth Lake, Salem, Oregon
- Wirth Lake (Minnesota)
