= Philip Wirth =

Australian circus proprietor (1864–1937)

- Born: Philip Peter Jacob Wirth; 29 June 1864; Beechworth, Victoria, Australia
- Died: 29 August 1937 (age 73); Coogee, New South Wales, Australia
- Resting place: North Road Cemetery
- Occupations: Bandsman; Circus proprietor; ringmaster
- Known for: Wirth's Circus
- Spouse: Alice Maude Willis
- Children: 6
- Father: John Wirth
- Family: May Wirth (niece)

Philip Peter Jacob Wirth (29 June 1864 – 29 August 1937) was an Australian bandsman and circus proprietor who with his brother ran Wirth's Circus, later Wirth Bros. Circus.

== Early life ==
Philip Peter Jacob Wirth was born in Beechworth, Victoria, Australia, on 29 June 1864.

His father was a Bavarian immigrant, and his mother was English. Johannes "John" Wirth, his father, moved from Germany to Australia in 1855, worked as a traveling musician, and in 1880 started a circus with his sons and daughters. Philip's siblings, John Jr., Harry, George, Marizles, Mina, and Madeline, formed the group.

== Career ==
Philip and his younger brother George began performing in their father's travelling band. All of the young Wirths played at least one instrument, while Philip specialized in the cornet.

At nine, he joined John Ridge's circus in New South Wales, but by thirteen he and his brothers John, Harry, and George had purchased a side show, launching his career as a proprietor.

Amid the Australian banking crisis of 1893, he traveled overseas. During the 1890s, Wirth fled South America amid anti-British demonstrations and later toured South Africa at the height of the Boer War.

Following the deaths of John Jr. in 1894 and Harry in 1896, Philip, with George and Marizles, directed Wirths' Circus. At its peak, it had 40 artists, 110 staff, 10 elephants, 40 horses, 14 cages of wild animals, and eight tents, the largest seating 3,000.

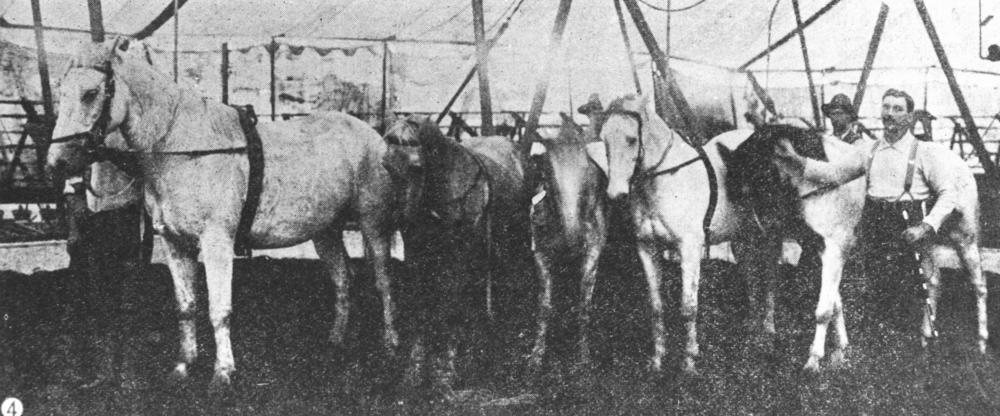
Philip Wirth and his educated horses in Brisbane, 1903

Philip and George Wirth incorporated Wirth Bros Circus Ltd. and from the 1910s managed the circus under the name Wirth Bros Circus. He shared the role of ringmaster with his brother George, importing horses, trainers, and acts from abroad. Philip also trained his niece May Wirth, billed as "the world's greatest bareback rider."

Wirth, having toured Australia and New Zealand, began a world tour in April 1923, sailing for the United States to bring in fresh talent and secure new wild animal acts.

After his brother George's retirement in 1930, Philip Wirth and his extended family continued to operate the circus until 1963. He remained in the role of governing director at Wirth's Circus.

In his older age, Philip Wirth learned the tin whistle and would often play it during circus performances. In 1937, ill health forced the tin whistle virtuoso to abandon the Wirth's Circus tour at Easter.

== Personal life and death ==
His first marriage, to Sarah Jane Wirth, ended with a judicial separation in August 1922. Philip Wirth later married Alice Maud Willis. He had six children: Eileen, Doris, Madeline, Phillip Jr., George, and Marizles.

In 1916, he established his family residence, "Oceanview," in Coogee, New South Wales.

Philip Wirth died in Coogee, New South Wales, Australia, on 29 August 1937, at age 73. He was interred in the family burial plot at North Road Cemetery.

== Legacy ==
Philip Wirth spent 55 years in circus management. He was known throughout Australia as the proprietor of the famous Wirth's Circus. At the time of his death, he claimed the distinction of being the world's oldest showman.

His autobiography The Life of Philip Wirth : a lifetime with an Australian circus was completed in November 1933, and published in 1934.
