= Wirt Township, Itasca County, Minnesota =

Wirt Township, Minnesota
- Township
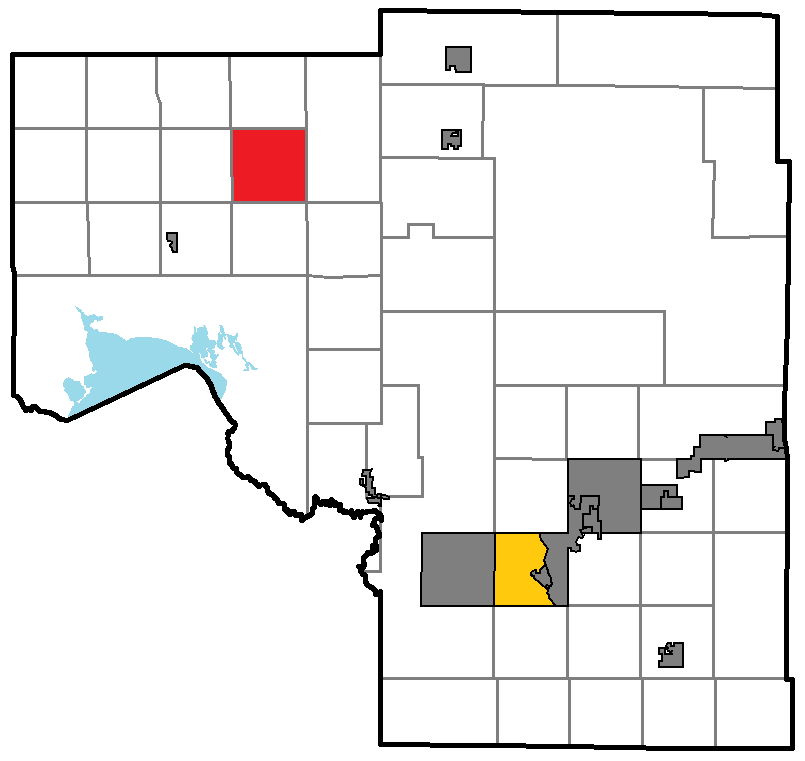
- Location of Wirt Township, within Itasca County, Minnesota
- Coordinates: 47°44′48″N 93°57′14″W
- Country: United States
- State: Minnesota
- County: Itasca

Area
  - Total: 36.2 sq mi (93.7 km^{2})
  - Land: 34.1 sq mi (88.3 km^{2})
  - Water: 2.1 sq mi (5.4 km^{2})
- Elevation: 1,335 ft (407 m)

Population (2020)
  - Total: 94
  - Density: 2.8/sq mi (1.1/km^{2})
- Time zone: UTC-6 (Central (CST))
  - Summer (DST): UTC-5 (CDT)
- ZIP code: 56688
- Area code: 218
- FIPS code: 27-71194
- GNIS feature ID: 0666031

Wirt Township is a township in Itasca County, Minnesota, United States. The population was 94 at the 2020 census.

Wirt Township was named for William Wirt, ninth United States Attorney General.

== Geography ==
According to the United States Census Bureau, the township has a total area of 36.2 square miles (93.7 km^{2}), of which 34.1 square miles (88.3 km^{2}) is land and 2.1 square miles (5.4 km^{2}), or 5.72%, is water.

== Demographics ==
As of the census of 2000, there were 94 people, 36 households, and 24 families living in the township. The population density was 2.8 people per square mile (1.1/km^{2}). There were 94 housing units at an average density of 2.8/sq mi (1.1/km^{2}). The racial makeup of the township was 90.43% White, 5.32% Native American, 1.06% Asian, 2.13% from other races, and 1.06% from two or more races.

There were 36 households, out of which 33.3% had children under the age of 18 living with them, 63.9% were married couples living together, and 30.6% were non-families. 22.2% of all households were made up of individuals, and 13.9% had someone living alone who was 65 years of age or older. The average household size was 2.61 and the average family size was 3.16.

In the township the population was spread out, with 26.6% under the age of 18, 5.3% from 18 to 24, 26.6% from 25 to 44, 20.2% from 45 to 64, and 21.3% who were 65 years of age or older. The median age was 41 years. For every 100 females, there were 113.6 males. For every 100 females age 18 and over, there were 109.1 males.

The median income for a household in the township was $32,500, and the median income for a family was $33,125. Males had a median income of $28,000 versus $41,250 for females. The per capita income for the township was $14,794. There were 7.1% of families and 5.5% of the population living below the poverty line, including 12.1% of under eighteens and none of those over 64.
