= Wirth's Circus =

Traveling circus company (1882–1963)

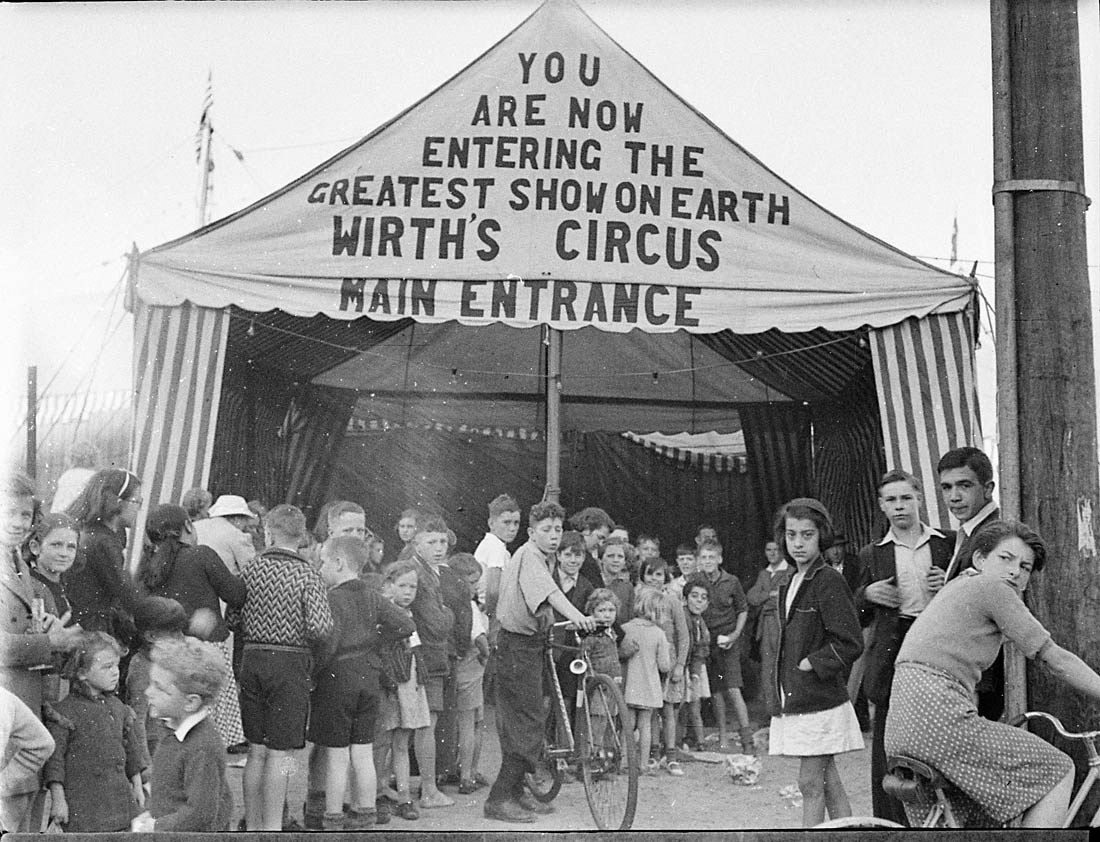
- Wirth's Circus, 1941 by Sam Hood

Origin
- Country: Australia
- Founder(s): Philip Wirth; George Wirth
- Year founded: 1882
- Defunct: 1963

Information
- Fate: Closed
- Traveling show?: Yes (Australia; global)

Wirth's Circus, also known as Wirth Brothers' Circus, was Australia's largest and most prestigious circus company for eight decades. Billed as Australia's own 'Greatest show on Earth' (a reference to the slogan of the American P. T. Barnum Circus), the travelling circus held an international reputation.

== The company ==
The company started with the children of brass musician and German-born Johannes 'John' (1834–10 July 1880) and his English-born wife Sarah Wirth:

- John James. He died 16 April 1894, aged 35, at Burghersdorf, South Africa, where the company was performing;
- Harry, who could do a double somersault over a row of fixed bayonets. Harry died 19 July 1896, aged 36 while near Hong Kong on the SS Kwang Lee, from sunstroke. He left a wife and three children;
- Philip Peter Jacob (26 June 1864 – 29 August 1937, aged 73), ringmaster, acrobat, animal trainer, musician. He married twice, and had seven children. Wirth built a two-storey Federation mansion, Ocean View in 1915 at Coogee, NSW;
- George (30 July 1867 – 16 October 1941, aged 74), ringmaster, acrobat, animal trainer, musician. He married Margaret Bain, but had no children, and retired from the circus in 1930 having built Margworth from 1926, a £30,000 waterfront mansion with ballroom beside Carthona in Darling Point (sold 1935 to Oliver Triggs);
- Mary Elizabeth Victoria 'Marizles' (1868–1948, aged 80), an equestrienne, remembered as the 'Grant old Lady of the Circus', who died in New York on 31 March 1948;
- Mina; and
- Madeline.

The parents had arrived in Australia in 1855, worked as itinerant musicians, including with Ashton's Circus. Commencing as a small travelling band of the Wirth family members, getting their first tent and performing under canvas in Sydney in 1880, they had formed a small circus by 1882. Established in Ballarat, the brothers first provincial tour commenced from Ararat in 1885, and Adelaide their first capital. Shortly after, the circus went to Nouméa.

Their bitter rivals were the FitzGerald Brothers Circus, although this subsided in 1906 of the death of the FitzGerald brothers: Dan (1859–Saturday 3 February 1906, aged 45) and Tom (died on Friday 27 April 1906, aged 40). At this time, the Wirths acquired the FitzGeralds' circus.

Philip Wirth's children, Eileen, Doris, Madelaine, Phillip, George, and Marizles 'Rillie' (died 1988), continued to run the circus until its closure in May 1963. Although the Bullen Brothers circus competition started impacting the family operation, the decline of the circus was principally attributed to rising transport costs and the introduction of television.

== Travelling circus (1882–1963) ==
With the Australian banking crisis of 1893, the Wirths went on a seven-year overseas tour. While giving a performance in October 1895 at Mount Video, Uruguay, the Politeama Theatre burnt down and was completely destroyed. Returning to South Africa, they found the Second Boer War in progress, but made their neutrality clear; but on one occasion, the circus train narrowly missed demolition as the Boers were about to blow a bridge over the Modder River.

While Philip Wirth was a ringmaster standing 6 feet (1.8 m) tall and weighing 14 stone (200 lb; 89 kg), he was also an expert horse trainer. In 1893 in South Africa, he trained a gnu to ride on the back of a horse, and broke and trained six zebras, which according to Wirth, The Bible allegedly said to be the only animal that could not be trained. When in South America in 1895, he trained two wild mustangs to waltz together. In another instance, a pony would enter the ring dressed as a woman, undress, put on a nightgown, blow out a candle and get into bed; teaching all done without cruelty, but patience and some sugar.

With an extending family and adopting family members, the troupe undertook significant world tours additional to travelling extensively by horse-drawn wagon and special trains around Australia. In 1901 May Wirth (1894–1978) became the adopted daughter of Mary, to become "greatest bareback riding star". She later was inducted in 1963 into the Circus Hall of Fame.

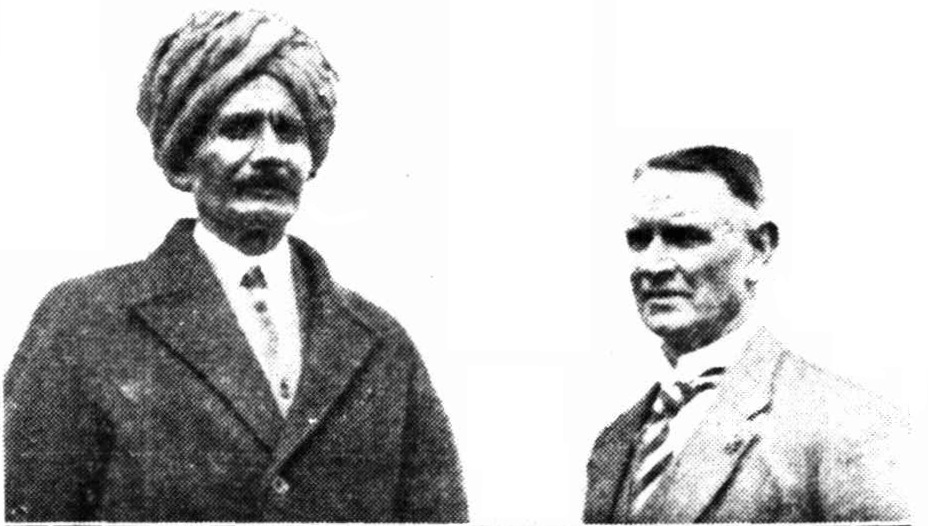
Singh, and Wirth's Circus advance manager, Charlie Peterson, in Perth, September 1929

Renown wrestler Buttan Singh performed with the company in the early 1900s, billed as one of the 'champion Hindu wrestlers of Australia'.

The 1903 programme, in a tent that held 400 people comfortably, with electric light, included:

- wild animal performance by Mons. Ragoul, which included bareback riding by a tiger;
- a tiger-drawn chariot with a tiger coachman;
- an elephant, bear, camel and monkey took afternoon-tea in the ring;
- acts of a funny clown;
- Brothers Howard with memory and object games;
- the Flying Eugenes in mid-air;
- Philip's daughter Phyllis performing on horseback like a 'human butterfly';
- The Cantons, two Anglo-Chinese acrobats, on a revolving ladder;
- contortionist Masinga;
- Philip Wirth taking the snow-white stallion' Moncrieff, through paces;
- a boxing match by a pair of ponys;
- Mary Wirth undertook juggling on horseback, while William Carl did a bareback riding act; and
- aerial Roman rings act, tumbling and riding.

Outside there was another tent with a menagerie of animals.

In July 1910, the circus had a lion, two lionesses and two Russian wolves escape at Murrurundi, NSW. In September 1917, a lion and lioness by means unknown were able to get loose at Campbelltown, NSW.

By 1930 Wirth's Circus was now operating on a two-yearly national tour, usually staged for August's Royal Exhibition Show in Brisbane, Easter in Sydney, and November's Melbourne Cup. The company presented winning jockeys with gold-mounted whips. The alternate year was a visit to New Zealand.

The circus was the only one allowed to operate during World War II in Australia, but faced the challenges of travel by road and petrol rationing. The troupe used Muston Park, Sydney, New South Wales as a performance area in 1942.

After World War II, painter Norma Bull (1906–1980) travelled with the company painting scenes of circus life for twelve months.

One of the circus' most famous elephants was 'Princess Alice'. George Wirth's favourite elephant was 'Jumbo' but had to be shot when it went rogue in Brisbane.

In the 1950s, the company used two Victorian Railways wooden bogie passenger carriages as accommodation in the 1950s. The circus staff complained about the poor condition of the carriages, which by that stage were over 60 years old. In 1962 the pair were withdrawn from the circus train.

== Wirth's Olympia Circus, Melbourne (1907–1957) ==
In 1901 the Arts Centre site on St Kilda Road, in Melbourne became home to a permanent circus, Olympia, built by the FitzGerald Brothers' Circus. Olympia was the name of their octagonal circus building. In 1904, the area of the site not occupied by FitzGerald's was developed as a fashionable meeting place called Prince's Court. This area featured a Japanese Tea House, open-air theatre, miniature train, water chute and a 15-member military band.

In 1907, with the passing of the FitzGerald Brothers, the Wirth Brothers Circus took over the entire site from FitzGerald's, and remained there for the next 50 years. The adjoining Prince's Court amusement park was acquired, merged, and became Wirth's Pleasure Park. By 1911 they had built a new circus Hippodrome (a 5000-seat auditorium) and a roller skating rink, and leased the original Olympia to Cosens Spencer as a cinema. During World War I some of the buildings were used as nursing homes for soldiers and nurses. During the 1920s a new Green Mill Dance Hall replaced the Jazz Pavilion and Olympia Dancing Palace.

Dog shows in 1929 were held at Olympia. The Green Mill Dance Hall closed in 1950, and the remainder of the Wirth buildings on the site, valued at £70,000, were destroyed by fire in December 1953.

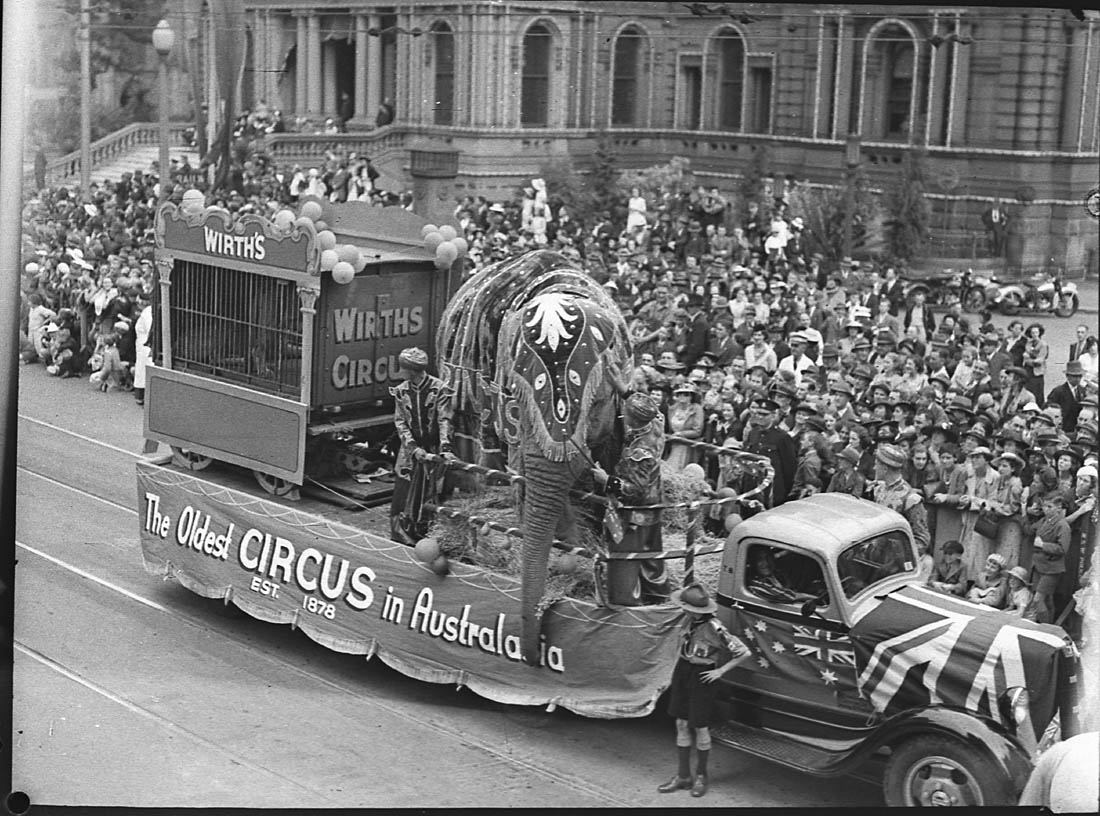
Elephant from Wirth's Circus in a Sydney street parade (1938)

== Wirth Brothers Hippodrome, Sydney (1916–1928) ==
The Sydney Council sought to replace the New Belmore Markets around Campbell Street, Haymarket, Sydney central business district by 1912. The area was initially used by the Wirth Brothers Circus for ten weeks in 1912 as a circus and hippodrome. This was successful and a twenty-one year lease was signed in September 1912. The company opened the new Wirth Brothers Hippodrome in April 1916. Attractions included elaborate circus acts with animals such as elephants and seals, theatre and vaudeville shows. Although performing with some success for a decade, the Hippodrome failed financially. Despite the Hippodrome's versatility, it was not a financial success and by 1926 Wirth's had decided to seek the remodelling of the buildings as a picture palace. With the Capitol Theatre opened on 7 April 1928, the circus moved to a nearby site at Wentworth Avenue and Goulburn Street.

== See also ==
- List of circuses and circus owners
