= May Wirth =

Australian circus performer

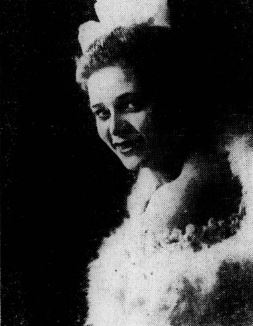
From a 1922 newspaper

May Emmeline Wirth (6 June 1894 – 18 October 1978) was an Australian circus and vaudeville performer famous for her ability to do somersaults forwards and backwards on a running horse. She was born in Queensland and adopted by Mary Elizabeth Victoria Wirth as a child into the Wirth circus family.

== Early life ==
Wirth was born in Bundaberg, Queensland on 6 June 1894. She was the daughter of a Mauritian circus artist, John Edward Zinga (Despoges) and Dezeppo Marie, née Beaumont.

In 1901, Wirth was adopted by Mary Wirth, an equestrienne and the sister of Wirth's Circus proprietors George and Philip Wirth.

== Career ==
From age 10, Wirth began performing in balancing and equestrian shows in Melbourne and Sydney.

Wirth performed with the Barnum and Bailey circus in the US, and was the star of Wirth's Circus in 1916, as the "greatest bareback riding star".

When aged 19, during her second year in the United States, she suffered severe injuries while performing in Brooklyn after her horse shied and she was dragged around the ring when her foot became caught.

She stopped performing in 1937 and started living in New York.

== Personal life ==
On 27 November 1919, Wirth married her manager, Frank White, who adopted her surname. The couple did not have children. She died in Sarasota, Florida, in 1978 and was cremated.

== Legacy ==
She was inducted to the Circus Hall of Fame as a bareback rider in 1964. In 1990, she was inducted in the Circus Ring of Fame as well.

Wirth and her step-sister Stella appeared on an Australia Post commemorative postage stamp issued on 13 March 1997 commemorating 150 years of circus in Australia.

In June 1988, a mosaic commemorating 150 years of circus entertainment in Australia, which features Wirth's Circus and portrays May Wirth dancing on horseback, was installed at the site of the Victorian Arts Center in Melbourne as a collaboration between the Performing Arts Museum, Victorian Arts Centre, and Circus Fans of Australasia Inc. It was designed by Joe Attard and David Jack (Melbourne Mural Studio) and was supported by the Commonwealth Department of Communications and the Arts.

In 2019, Australian circus performer Simi Genzuik published So She Did. The Story of May Wirth: the Greatest Bareback Rider of All Time, a children's book illustrated by Renee Treml and accompanied by real pictures, featuring May Wirth's artistic career.

In 2022, she was one of the 26 nominees to the "Recognising inspiring women in our region" project, promoted by the Bundaberg Regional Council, which encouraged citizens to put forward local women's feats so as to construct public memorials. In her nomination, she was referred to as "a young woman of courage and skill who, when young girls were not encouraged to be bold and daring, decided to do things her own way. A real role-model". That same year, the Illinois State University held a photograph exhibit featuring portraits of circus artists of the 19th-century and beginning of the 20th, with pictures of May Wirth and her step-sister Stella, Lillian Leitzel, Victoria Codona or Lavinia Warren.
