= KOZY =

KOZY may refer to:

- KOZY (AM), a radio station (1320 AM) licensed to Grand Rapids, Minnesota, United States
- KOZY-FM, a radio station (101.3 FM) licensed to Bridgeport, Nebraska, United States
