= Grand Rapids, Minnesota =

City in Minnesota, United States

- City
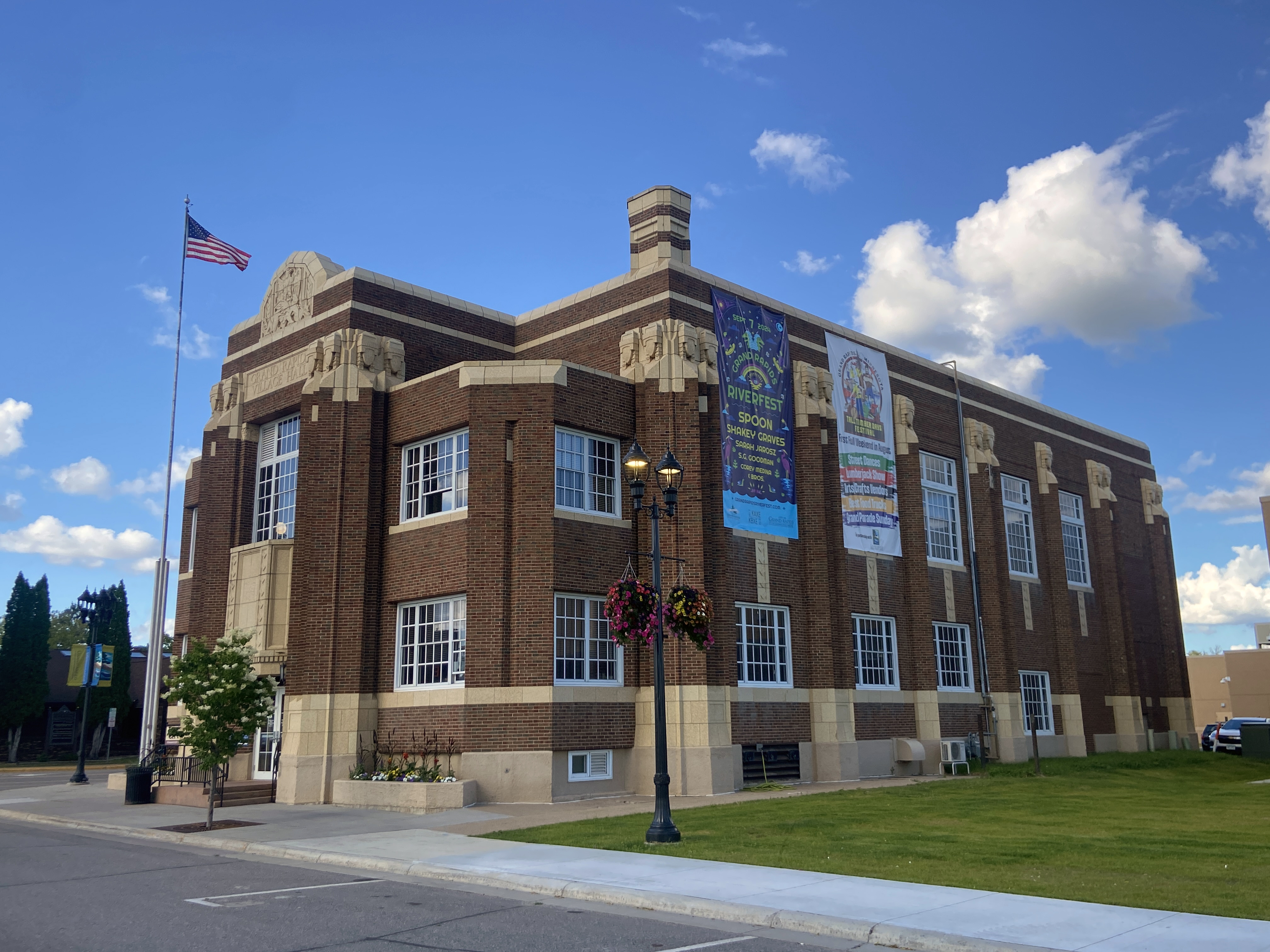
- City Hall
- Motto: "It's In Minnesota's Nature"
- Location of Grand Rapids in Itasca County and Minnesota
- Coordinates: 47°14′14″N 93°31′49″W
- Country: United States
- State: Minnesota
- County: Itasca
- Settled: 1872
- Incorporated (village): June 9, 1891
- Established (county seat): November 8, 1892
- Incorporated (city): 1957

Government
  - Type: Mayor – Council
  - Mayor: Cameron Fox

Area
  - Total: 24.46 sq mi (63.36 km^{2})
  - Land: 22.57 sq mi (58.46 km^{2})
  - Water: 1.89 sq mi (4.90 km^{2})
- Elevation: 1,289 ft (393 m)

Population (2020)
  - Total: 11,126
  - Estimate (2021): 11,220
  - Density: 492.9/sq mi (190.32/km^{2})
- Time zone: UTC-6 (Central)
  - Summer (DST): UTC-5 (CDT)
- ZIP code: 55744
- Area code: 218
- FIPS code: 27-25118
- GNIS feature ID: 0656428
- Website: cityofgrandrapidsmn.com

Grand Rapids is a city in, and the county seat of, Itasca County, Minnesota, United States. The population was 11,126 at the 2020 census. The city is named for the 3.5-mile (5.6 km) long rapids on the Mississippi River that was the uppermost limit of practical steamboat travel in the late 19th century. Today the rapids are hidden below the dam of UPM Paper Company.

== History ==
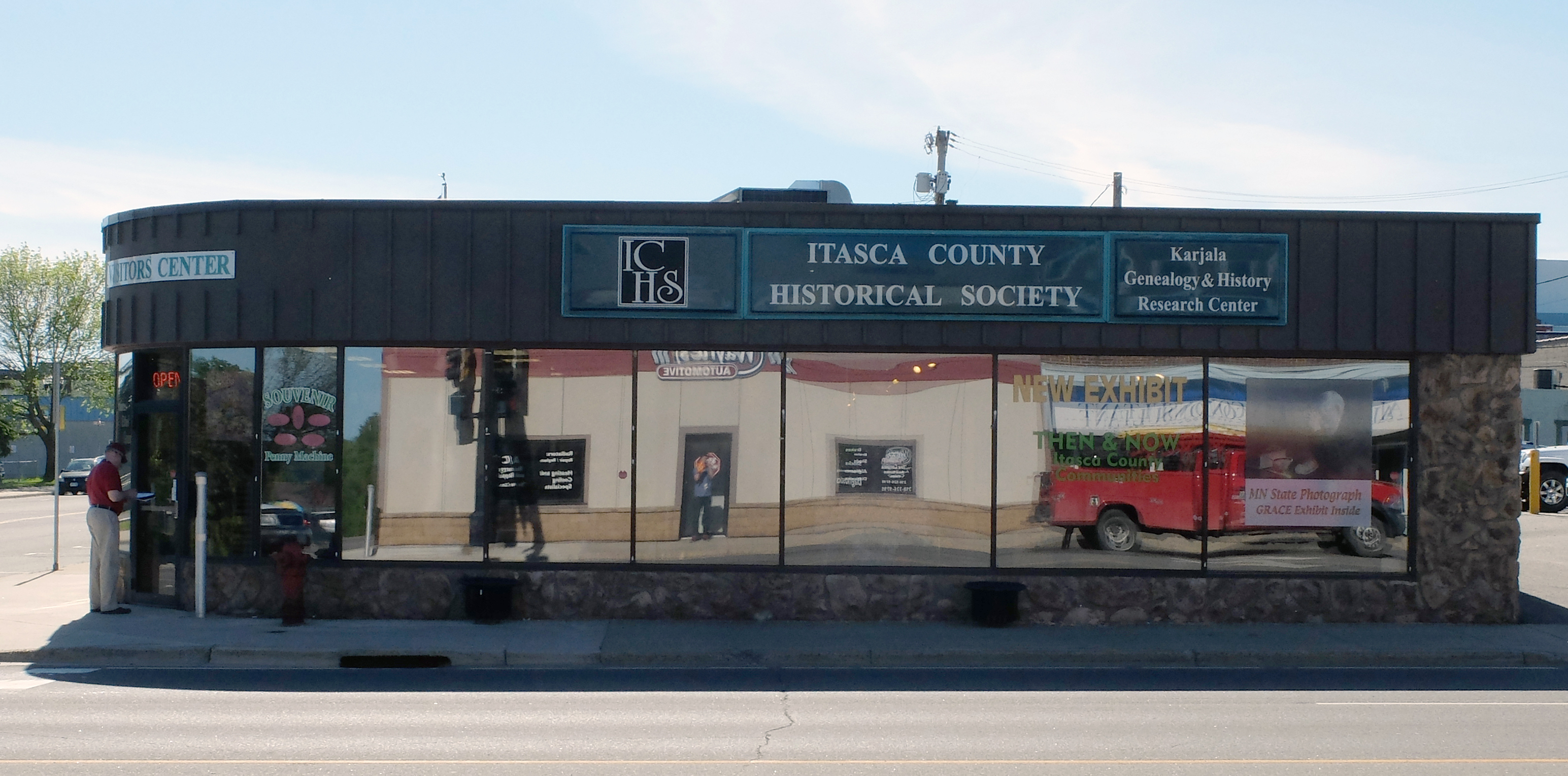
Itasca Heritage Center

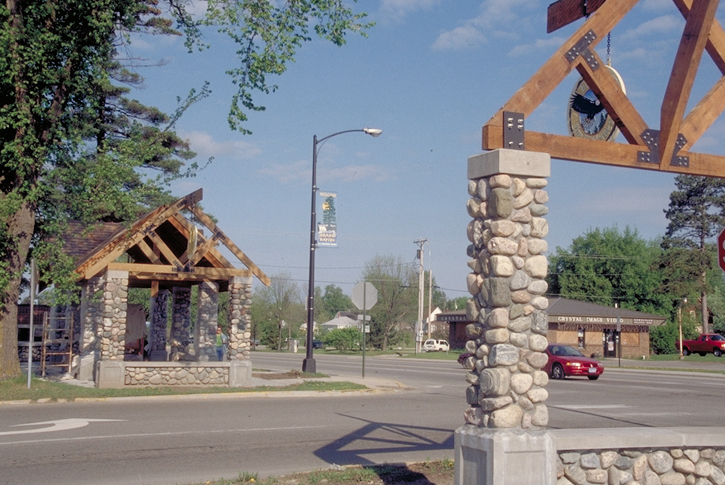
The gateway to the Edge of the Wilderness Scenic Byway in Grand Rapids welcomes visitors to one of the terminus towns of the Byway.

Grand Rapids became a logging town, as the Mississippi River provided an optimal way to ship logs to population centers. Blandin Paper Mill opened in 1902. The Forest History Center, in Grand Rapids, is a State Historic Site and a living history museum that recreates life in a turn-of-the-20th-century logging camp. Costumed interpreters educate visitors on the history of white pine logging and its relevance to today's economy. Miles of nature trails, educational naturalist programming, and an interpretive museum are also at the site.

Old Central School, in downtown Grand Rapids, was built in 1895 in the Richardsonian Romanesque style of architecture. The three-story building served as an elementary school from 1895 to 1972. A community effort restored the building in 1984 and it now serves as a location for commerce and is listed on the National Register of Historic Places.

In 1991, Enbridge's Line 3 pipeline ruptured, spilling 1.7 million gallons of oil into the area, including the Prairie River, in the largest inland oil spill in U.S. history.

== Geography ==
According to the United States Census Bureau, the city has an area of 24.44 square miles (63.30 km^{2}), of which 22.56 square miles (58.43 km^{2}) is land and 1.88 square miles (4.87 km^{2}) is water.

=== Major highways ===
Grand Rapids is at the junction of U.S. Highways 2 and 169. U.S. Highway 2 runs west toward Bemidji and east toward Duluth. U.S. Highway 169 heads south to Hill City and ultimately to Minneapolis. In the opposite direction, U.S. Highway 169 heads up the Mesabi Range, passing through Hibbing and several smaller towns until it reaches the city of Virginia. Grand Rapids is also the starting point of State Highway 38, designated a National Scenic Byway by the United States Department of Transportation and marked as the Edge of the Wilderness Scenic Byway as it travels toward Effie. The following routes are within Grand Rapids:

- U.S. Highway 2
- U.S. Highway 169
- Minnesota State Highway 38 – Edge of the Wilderness Scenic Byway

=== Climate ===
Grand Rapids has a Humid continental climate (Köppen Climate Classification Dfb) with warm summers and long, cold winters, typical of its location on the Mesabi Iron Range.

Climate data for Grand Rapids, Minnesota (1991–2020 normals, records 1915–present)
Month	Jan	Feb	Mar	Apr	May	Jun	Jul	Aug	Sep	Oct	Nov	Dec	Year
Record high °F (°C)	51 (11)	61 (16)	80 (27)	93 (34)	101 (38)	100 (38)	104 (40)	100 (38)	99 (37)	89 (32)	74 (23)	59 (15)	104 (40)
Mean maximum °F (°C)	41.0 (5.0)	47.3 (8.5)	60.9 (16.1)	75.1 (23.9)	86.2 (30.1)	89.2 (31.8)	91.0 (32.8)	90.0 (32.2)	85.4 (29.7)	76.9 (24.9)	56.6 (13.7)	42.1 (5.6)	93.0 (33.9)
Mean daily maximum °F (°C)	18.9 (−7.3)	25.7 (−3.5)	38.8 (3.8)	52.6 (11.4)	66.1 (18.9)	75.2 (24.0)	79.7 (26.5)	77.8 (25.4)	68.1 (20.1)	52.8 (11.6)	36.1 (2.3)	23.1 (−4.9)	51.2 (10.7)
Daily mean °F (°C)	8.7 (−12.9)	13.9 (−10.1)	27.1 (−2.7)	40.3 (4.6)	53.2 (11.8)	62.9 (17.2)	67.6 (19.8)	65.5 (18.6)	56.4 (13.6)	43.1 (6.2)	28.1 (−2.2)	14.8 (−9.6)	40.1 (4.5)
Mean daily minimum °F (°C)	−1.5 (−18.6)	2.1 (−16.6)	15.4 (−9.2)	28.0 (−2.2)	40.2 (4.6)	50.5 (10.3)	55.4 (13.0)	53.2 (11.8)	44.7 (7.1)	33.3 (0.7)	20.1 (−6.6)	6.5 (−14.2)	29.0 (−1.7)
Mean minimum °F (°C)	−26.4 (−32.4)	−21.5 (−29.7)	−10.5 (−23.6)	13.9 (−10.1)	27.2 (−2.7)	37.8 (3.2)	44.9 (7.2)	42.1 (5.6)	30.3 (−0.9)	20.3 (−6.5)	1.5 (−16.9)	−18.5 (−28.1)	−29.0 (−33.9)
Record low °F (°C)	−51 (−46)	−45 (−43)	−39 (−39)	−10 (−23)	11 (−12)	24 (−4)	33 (1)	27 (−3)	15 (−9)	−3 (−19)	−25 (−32)	−45 (−43)	−51 (−46)
Average precipitation inches (mm)	0.97 (25)	0.85 (22)	1.33 (34)	2.10 (53)	3.23 (82)	4.70 (119)	4.14 (105)	3.40 (86)	3.05 (77)	2.79 (71)	1.59 (40)	1.23 (31)	29.38 (746)
Average snowfall inches (cm)	12.2 (31)	9.7 (25)	7.5 (19)	5.6 (14)	0.2 (0.51)	0.0 (0.0)	0.0 (0.0)	0.0 (0.0)	0.0 (0.0)	2.0 (5.1)	9.0 (23)	13.4 (34)	59.6 (151)
Average extreme snow depth inches (cm)	15.0 (38)	18.1 (46)	16.7 (42)	5.9 (15)	0.1 (0.25)	0.0 (0.0)	0.0 (0.0)	0.0 (0.0)	0.0 (0.0)	0.9 (2.3)	5.6 (14)	10.2 (26)	19.6 (50)
Average precipitation days (≥ 0.01 in)	10.9	8.8	8.4	9.8	12.7	13.5	12.2	10.4	11.4	11.3	10.6	11.7	131.7
Average snowy days (≥ 0.1 in)	11.5	8.7	6.3	3.8	0.3	0.0	0.0	0.0	0.0	1.7	7.3	11.8	51.4
Source: NOAA

== Demographics ==
Historical population
Census	Pop.	Note	%±
1900	1,428		—
1910	2,230		56.2%
1920	2,914		30.7%
1930	3,205		10.0%
1940	4,875		52.1%
1950	6,019		23.5%
1960	7,265		20.7%
1970	7,247		−0.2%
1980	7,934		9.5%
1990	7,976		0.5%
2000	7,764		−2.7%
2010	10,869		40.0%
2020	11,126		2.4%
2021 (est.)	11,220		0.8%
U.S. Decennial Census; 2020 Census

=== 2020 census ===
As of the 2020 census, Grand Rapids had a population of 11,126. The median age was 41.5 years. 22.8% of residents were under the age of 18 and 23.5% of residents were 65 years of age or older. For every 100 females there were 90.6 males, and for every 100 females age 18 and over there were 87.5 males age 18 and over.

82.0% of residents lived in urban areas, while 18.0% lived in rural areas.

There were 4,761 households in Grand Rapids, of which 25.8% had children under the age of 18 living in them. Of all households, 39.0% were married-couple households, 19.4% were households with a male householder and no spouse or partner present, and 33.4% were households with a female householder and no spouse or partner present. About 38.7% of all households were made up of individuals and 18.3% had someone living alone who was 65 years of age or older.

There were 5,142 housing units, of which 7.4% were vacant. The homeowner vacancy rate was 2.2% and the rental vacancy rate was 6.3%.

Racial composition as of the 2020 census
Race	Number	Percent
White	10,037	90.2%
Black or African American	101	0.9%
American Indian and Alaska Native	222	2.0%
Asian	63	0.6%
Native Hawaiian and Other Pacific Islander	2	0.0%
Some other race	49	0.4%
Two or more races	652	5.9%
Hispanic or Latino (of any race)	170	1.5%

=== 2010 census ===
As of the census of 2010, there were 10,869 people, 4,615 households, and 2,633 families living in the city. The population density was 481.8 inhabitants per square mile (186.0/km^{2}). There were 4,910 housing units at an average density of 217.6 per square mile (84.0/km^{2}). The racial makeup of the city was 94.6% White, 0.6% African American, 1.9% Native American, 0.6% Asian, 0.3% from other races, and 2.0% from two or more races. Hispanic or Latino of any race were 1.2% of the population.

There were 4,615 households, of which 26.6% had children under the age of 18 living with them, 41.1% were married couples living together, 12.4% had a female householder with no husband present, 3.6% had a male householder with no wife present, and 42.9% were non-families. 36.5% of all households were made up of individuals, and 17.1% had someone living alone who was 65 years of age or older. The average household size was 2.20 and the average family size was 2.84.

The median age in the city was 42 years. 22.2% of residents were under the age of 18; 8.5% were between the ages of 18 and 24; 22.4% were from 25 to 44; 26% were from 45 to 64; and 20.8% were 65 years of age or older. The gender makeup of the city was 47.5% male and 52.5% female.

=== 2000 census ===
As of the census of 2000, there were 7,764 people, 3,446 households, and 1,943 families living in the city. The population density was 1,057.8 inhabitants per square mile (408.4/km^{2}). There were 3,621 housing units at an average density of 493.3 per square mile (190.5/km^{2}). The racial makeup of the city was 95.53% White, 0.28% African American, 1.93% Native American, 0.71% Asian, 0.03% Pacific Islander, 0.39% from other races, and 1.13% from two or more races. Hispanic or Latino of any race were 0.85% of the population.

There were 3,446 households, out of which 25.6% had children under the age of 18 living with them, 41.5% were married couples living together, 11.8% had a female householder with no husband present, and 43.6% were non-families. 38.1% of all households were made up of individuals, and 20.4% had someone living alone who was 65 years of age or older. The average household size was 2.15 and the average family size was 2.82.

In the city, the population was spread out, with 22.1% under the age of 18, 10.0% from 18 to 24, 23.9% from 25 to 44, 21.0% from 45 to 64, and 23.0% who were 65 years of age or older. The median age was 41 years. For every 100 females, there were 87.0 males. For every 100 females age 18 and over, there were 81.7 males.

The median income for a household in the city was $28,991, and the median income for a family was $39,468. Males had a median income of $36,035 versus $20,759 for females. The per capita income for the city was $17,223. About 9.2% of families and 11.2% of the population were below the poverty line, including 15.1% of those under age 18 and 6.4% of those age 65 or over.

== Religion ==
Churches in Grand Rapids include the First Lutheran Church(LCMS), New Song Alliance Church, the Grand Rapids Alliance Church, the Grand Rapids Evangelical Free Church, St. Luke's Evangelical Lutheran Church, member of the Wisconsin Evangelical Lutheran Synod (WELS); St. Andrew's Lutheran Church and Zion Lutheran Churches, members of the Evangelical Lutheran Church in America (ELCA);, the United Methodist Church of Grand Rapids, St. Joseph's Roman Catholic Church, Full Gospel Church, Grand Rapids, River of Life Church; Apostolic; Pentecostal; and the non-denominational Grace Bible Chapel.

== Government ==
Grand Rapids is represented at the federal and state level by:

- U.S. Senators Amy Klobuchar and Tina Smith
- U.S. Representative Pete Stauber
- State Senator Justin Eichorn (until his resignation)
- State Representative Spencer Igo

== Economy ==
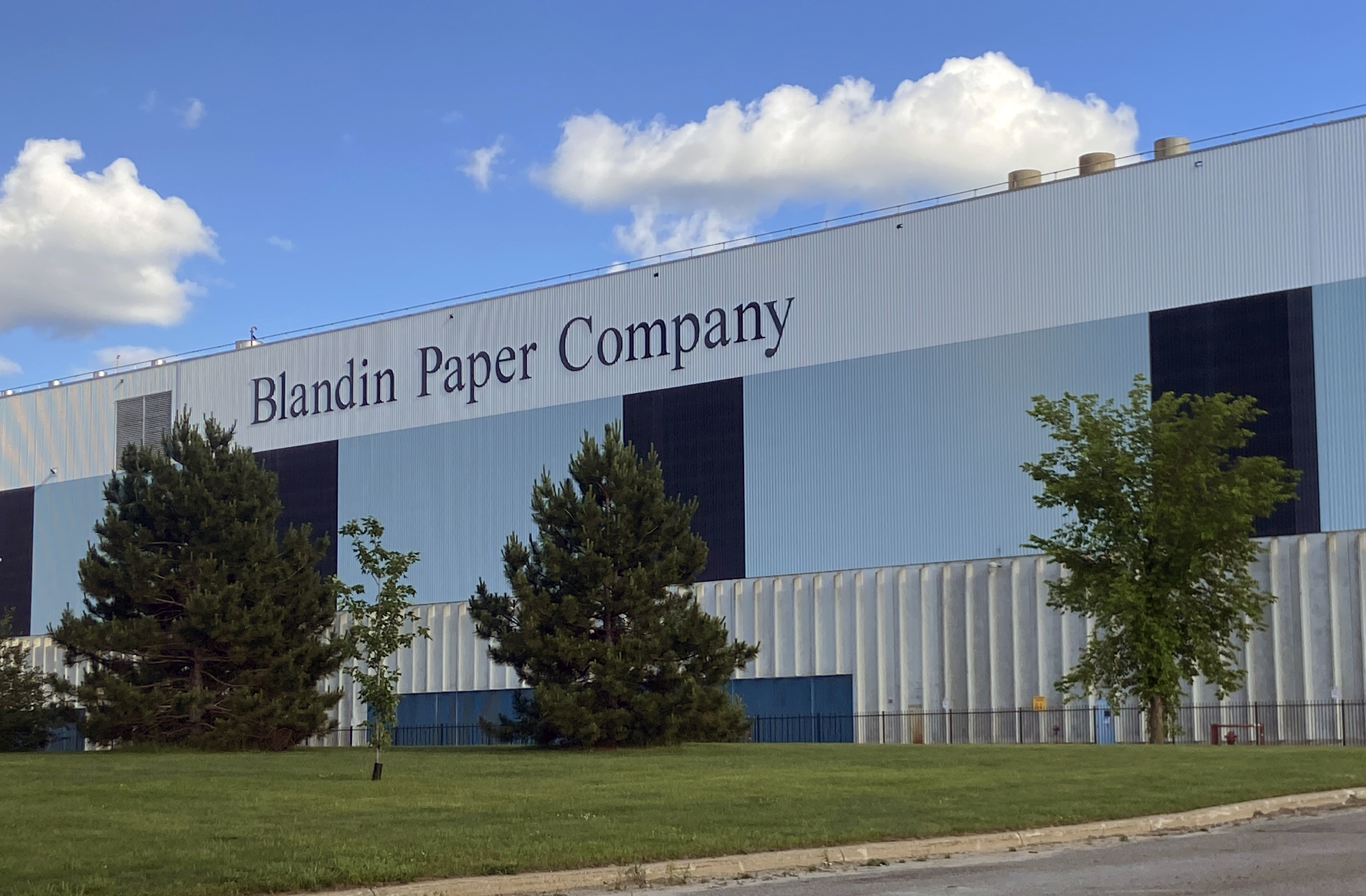
UPM Blandin paper mill

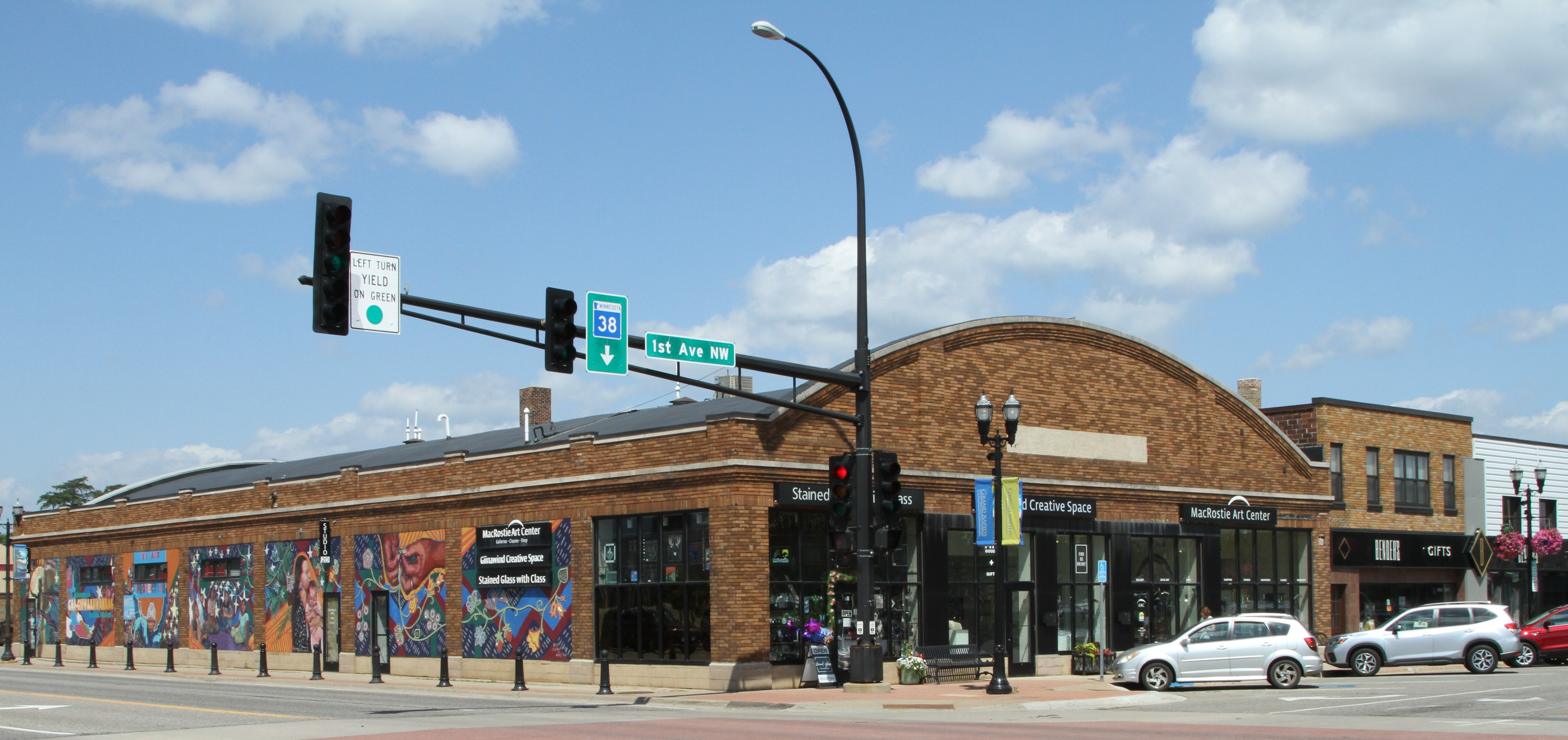
Shops in downtown Grand Rapids

Historically, Grand Rapids's economy was based on timber harvesting; Blandin Paper Mill—now owned by the Finnish-based UPM paper company—still has paper-making facilities downtown. Ainsworth (formerly Potlach) produced oriented strand board and was just outside the city limits. It ceased operations in 2006.

The Mesabi Range or Iron Range, often called "The Range", begins in Grand Rapids with one iron mine southwest and several northeast of the city. Although technically and geographically part of the Iron Range, Grand Rapids's economy has historically been based on paper manufacturing and other wood products.

The economy also has a large tourist footing, with many resorts, four golf courses, over a million acres (4,000 km^{2}) of public and industrial forests that provide excellent hunting, and more than 1,000 lakes for fishing. It also is the service center for 46,000 people due to a large seasonal and weekend population of summer residences on surrounding lakes, and a number of smaller bedroom communities nearby.

=== Annual tourism events ===
- Home & Cabin Show – March
- White Oak Classic Dog Sled Race – March
- Children's Fair – April
- Bluegrass Music in the Pines Festival – June
- Itasca Pride – June
- Wizard of Oz Festival – June
- Timberman Triathlon - July
- Weekend On Wheels Northern Minnesota Swap Meet & Car Show – July
- Tall Timber Days – August
- Grand Slam of Golf Tournament – August
- Threshing & Antique Show – August
- Bargains are Great on 38 – September
- Mississippi River Festival – September
- National Ruffed Grouse Society Annual Hunt – October
- WinterGlo Festival – December

== Education ==
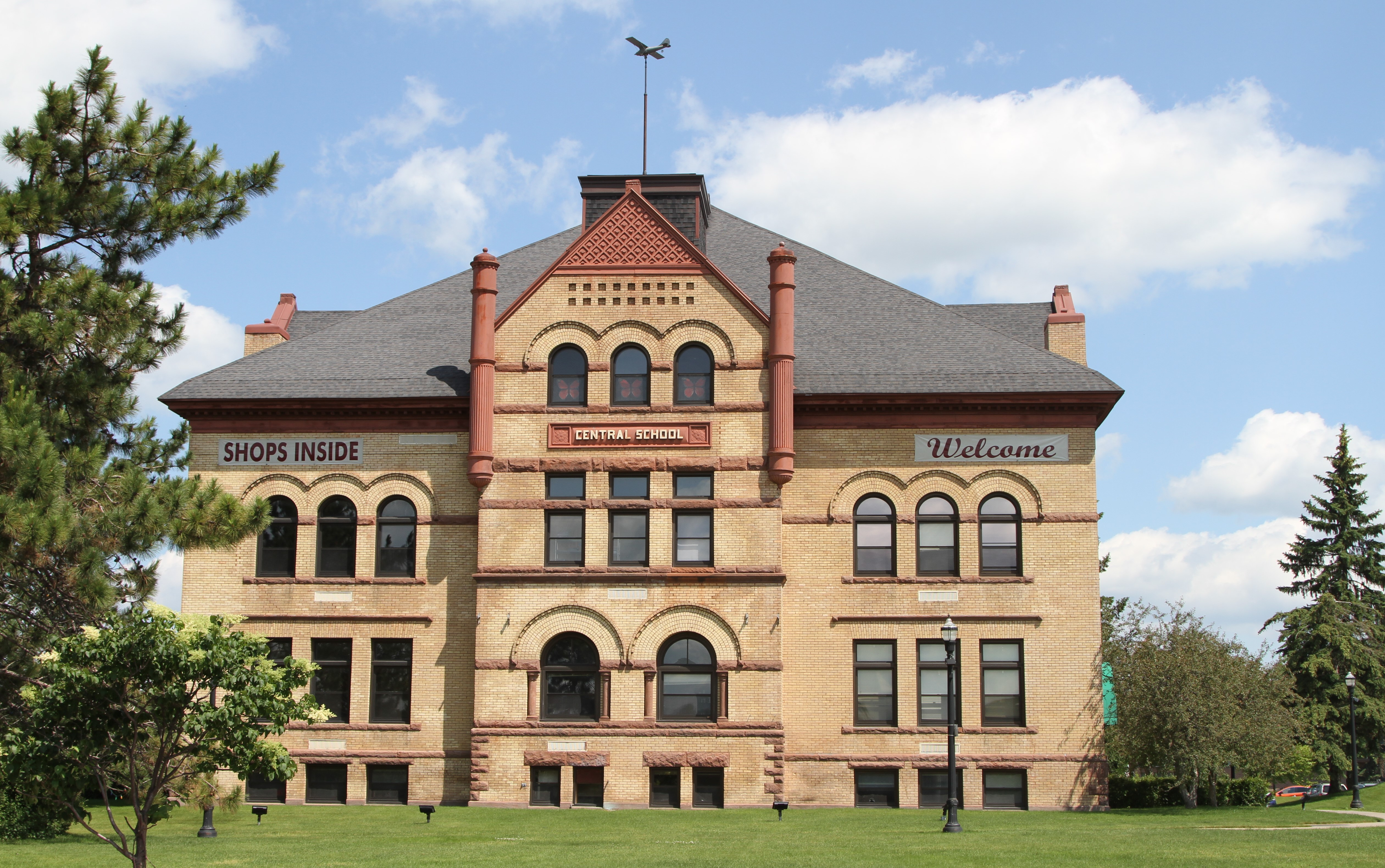
The Old Central School, now a mall and civic center

The public school district is ISD 318. West Elementary, East Elementary, Robert J. Elkington Middle School, and Grand Rapids High School are within the city limits. Parochial schools include St. Joseph's Catholic School. Minnesota North College – Itasca serves the community.

== Media ==
=== Local radio stations ===
The following radio stations are based in Grand Rapids. The city is also served by many other stations in the Iron Range.

- KOZY 1320 AM – Talk/Oldies
- K201IX FM 88.1, Simulcasting Duluth's Contemporary Christian KDNW owned by the University of Northwestern – St. Paul
- KMFY 96.9 FM – Adult Contemporary
- KAXE 91.7 FM – Public Radio (first rural public radio station in the United States)
- WDKE 96.1 FM – Country
- K256CW FM 99.1, simulcasting Duluth's Christian talk and teaching KDNI owned by the University of Northwestern – St. Paul
- KBAJ 105.5 FM – Classic rock

=== Newspapers ===
- Grand Rapids Herald-Review – published on Sundays and Wednesdays.

=== Television stations ===
Grand Rapids TV is primarily fed in from Duluth stations, but some cable subscribers also receive Bemidji and Minneapolis stations. Local government and community events are covered by the local community television station. Television stations available in Grand Rapids are:

- KAWE 9 – PBS station based in Bemidji.
- KRII 11 – NBC station serving Chisholm/Hibbing (multiplexed into several digital subchannels; 11.1 rebroadcasts KBJR-TV NBC 6 of Duluth & 11.3 rebroadcasts KDLH CBS 3 of Duluth).
- KCCW 12 – CBS station serving Walker/Bemidji/Brainerd (rebroadcast of WCCO-TV CBS 4 of Minneapolis).
- WIRT 13 – ABC station serving Hibbing (rebroadcast of WDIO ABC 10 of Duluth).
- K29EB 29 – Translator of KQDS-TV FOX 21 of Duluth.
- WRPT 31 – PBS station serving Hibbing (rebroadcast of WDSE PBS 8 of Duluth).

== Notable people ==
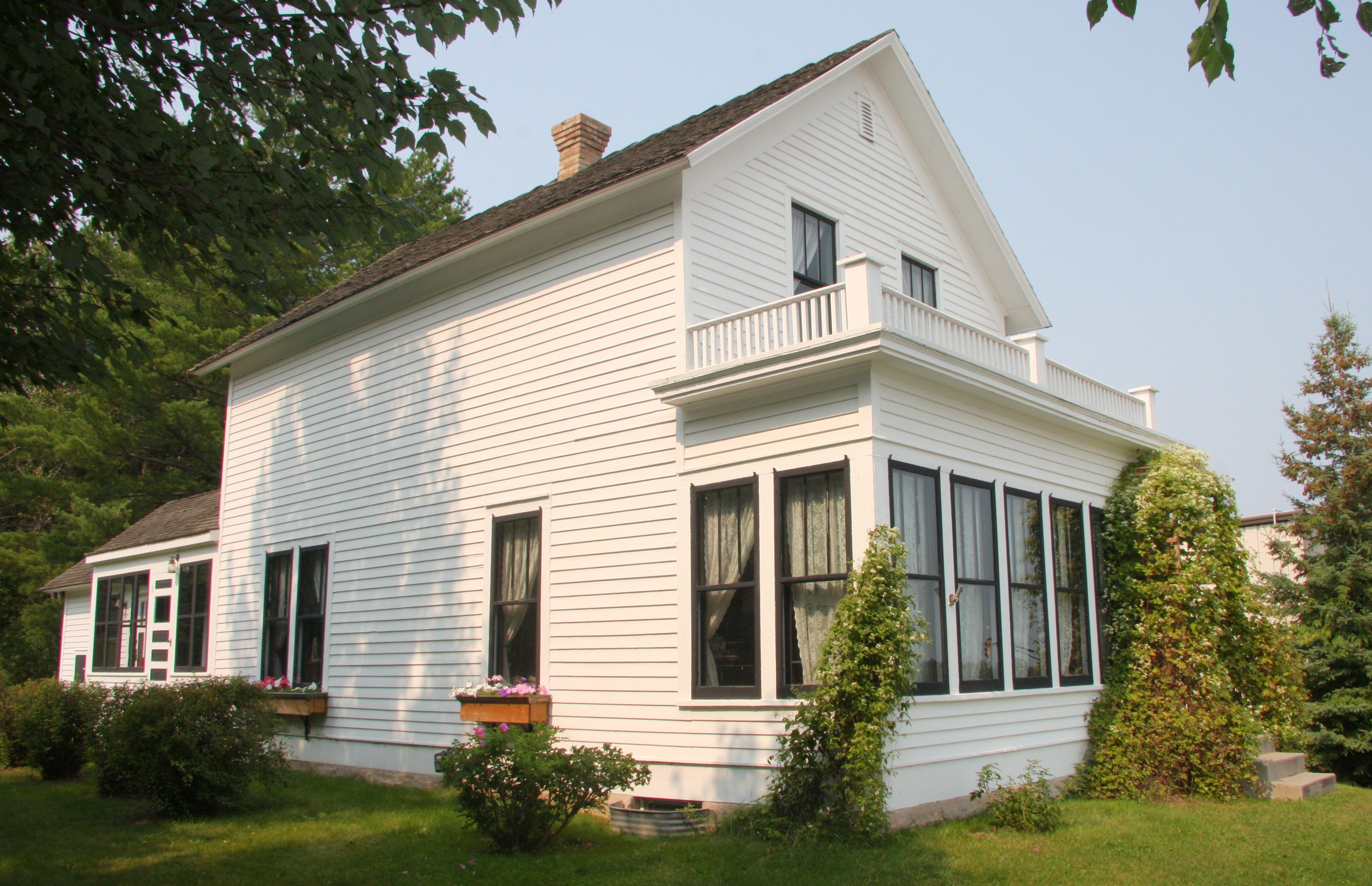
Judy Garland's Birthplace

- Bill Baker, member of the Miracle on Ice 1980 U.S. Olympic Hockey Team
- Chilton C. Baker, member of the Minnesota House of Representatives
- Hugh Beaumont, known for Leave it to Beaver
- Jon Casey, professional hockey player
- Justin Eichorn, member of the Minnesota Senate
- Eric Enstrom, photographer of Grace, the state photograph of Minnesota
- Judy Garland, actress and singer, born June 10, 1922, in Grand Rapids
- Alex Goligoski, professional hockey player
- Lois Hall, actress
- Adam Johnson, professional hockey player
- Trent Klatt, professional hockey player
- Robert N. Lemen, member of the Minnesota House of Representatives
- Don Lucia, University of Minnesota hockey coach
- Jeff Nielsen, professional hockey player
- Norman Ornstein, political scientist
- Jim Pehler, Minnesota state legislator
- Dick Pesonen, professional football player
- Janelle Pierzina, Big Brother cast member
- Norman Rudolph Prahl, Minnesota state legislator
- Jon Rohloff, professional hockey player
- Dusty Rychart, basketball player for the Cairns Taipans
- Granville Van Dusen, actor
