= Vivian, South Dakota =

- Census-designated place
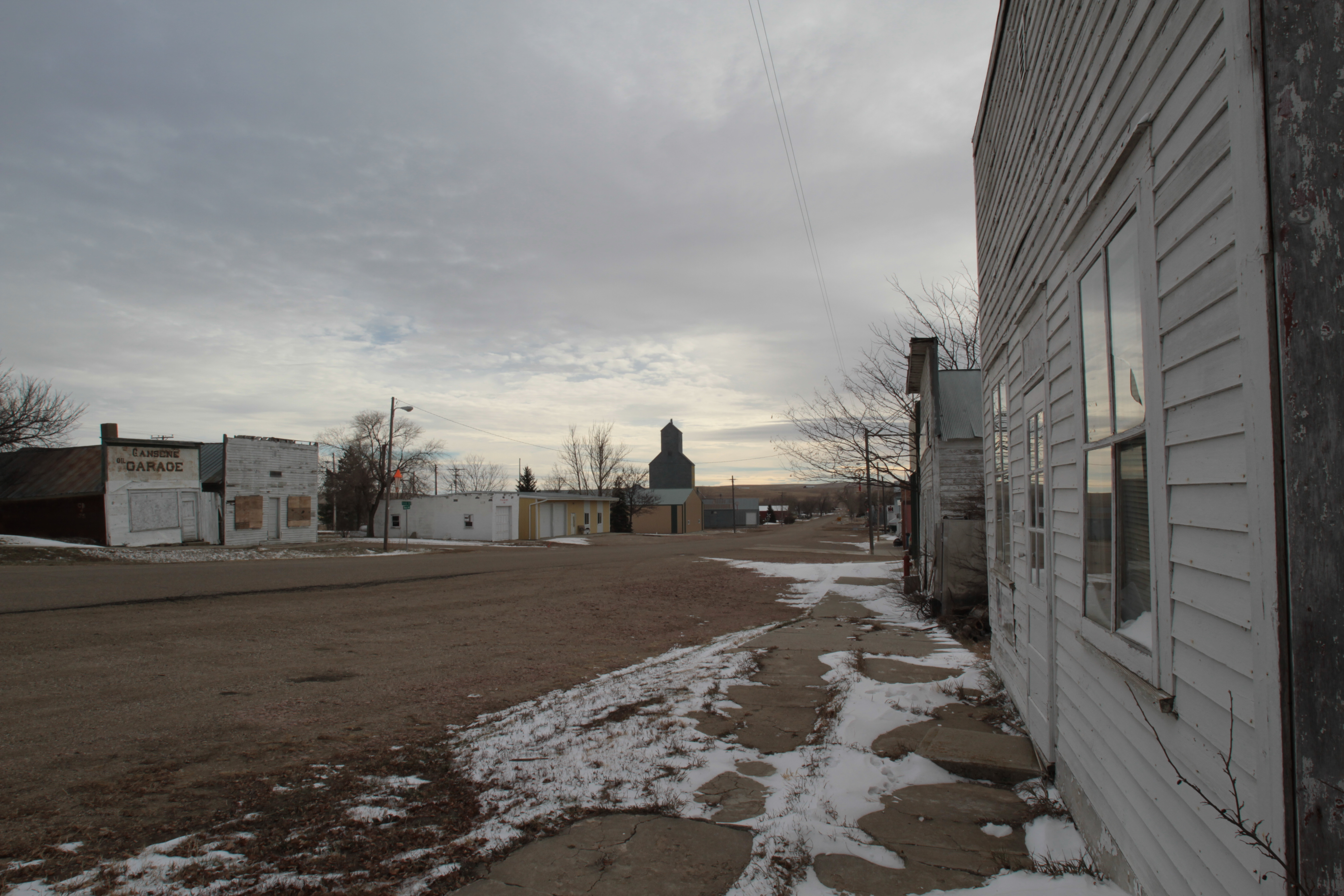
- Downtown Vivian, December 2010

- Location in Lyman County and the state of South Dakota
- Coordinates: 43°55′38″N 100°18′04″W
- Country: United States
- State: South Dakota
- Counties: Lyman

Area
  - Total: 1.73 sq mi (4.48 km^{2})
  - Land: 1.73 sq mi (4.48 km^{2})
  - Water: 0 sq mi (0.00 km^{2})
- Elevation: 1,896 ft (578 m)

Population (2020)
  - Total: 98
  - Density: 56.7/sq mi (21.89/km^{2})
- ZIP Code: 57576
- FIPS code: 46-67620
- GNIS feature ID: 2393835

Vivian is an unincorporated community and census-designated place (CDP) in Lyman County, South Dakota, United States. The population was 98 at the 2020 census.

== History ==
The community is named after Vivian Hunter, the wife of an official of the Milwaukee railroad. Norman Rudolph Prahl (1919-1996), Minnesota state legislator, was born in Vivian.

== Geography ==
Vivian is located in western Lyman County 1 mile (1.6 km) north of Interstate 90, with access from Exit 214, and 1.5 miles (2.4 km) east of U.S. Route 83. Via I-90 it is 23 miles (37 km) east to Kennebec, the Lyman county seat, and the same distance west to Murdo, the seat of neighboring Jones County. US-83 leads north 34 miles (55 km) to Pierre, the state capital.

According to the United States Census Bureau, the Vivian CDP has a total area of 1.7 square miles (4.5 km^{2}), all land. The community drains to Medicine Creek, an intermittent stream that flows east to the Missouri River.

== Demographics ==
Historical population
Census	Pop.	Note	%±
2020	98		—
U.S. Decennial Census

As of the census of 2000, there were 131 people, 55 households, and 36 families residing in the CDP. The population density was 76.4 inhabitants per square mile (29.5/km^{2}). There were 61 housing units at an average density of 35.6 per square mile (13.7/km^{2}). The racial makeup of the CDP was 99.24% White and 0.76% Native American.

There were 55 households, out of which 23.6% had children under the age of 18 living with them, 54.5% were married couples living together, 3.6% had a female householder with no husband present, and 34.5% were non-families. 34.5% of all households were made up of individuals, and 10.9% had someone living alone who was 65 years of age or older. The average household size was 2.38 and the average family size was 3.06.

In the CDP, the population was spread out, with 19.1% under the age of 18, 6.1% from 18 to 24, 22.1% from 25 to 44, 29.0% from 45 to 64, and 23.7% who were 65 years of age or older. The median age was 46 years. For every 100 females, there were 111.3 males. For every 100 females age 18 and over, there were 116.3 males.

The median income for a household in the CDP was $25,227, and the median income for a family was $26,477. Males had a median income of $26,111 versus $15,000 for females. The per capita income for the CDP was $13,503. There were 7.3% of families and 13.6% of the population living below the poverty line, including no under eighteens and 22.9% of those over 64.

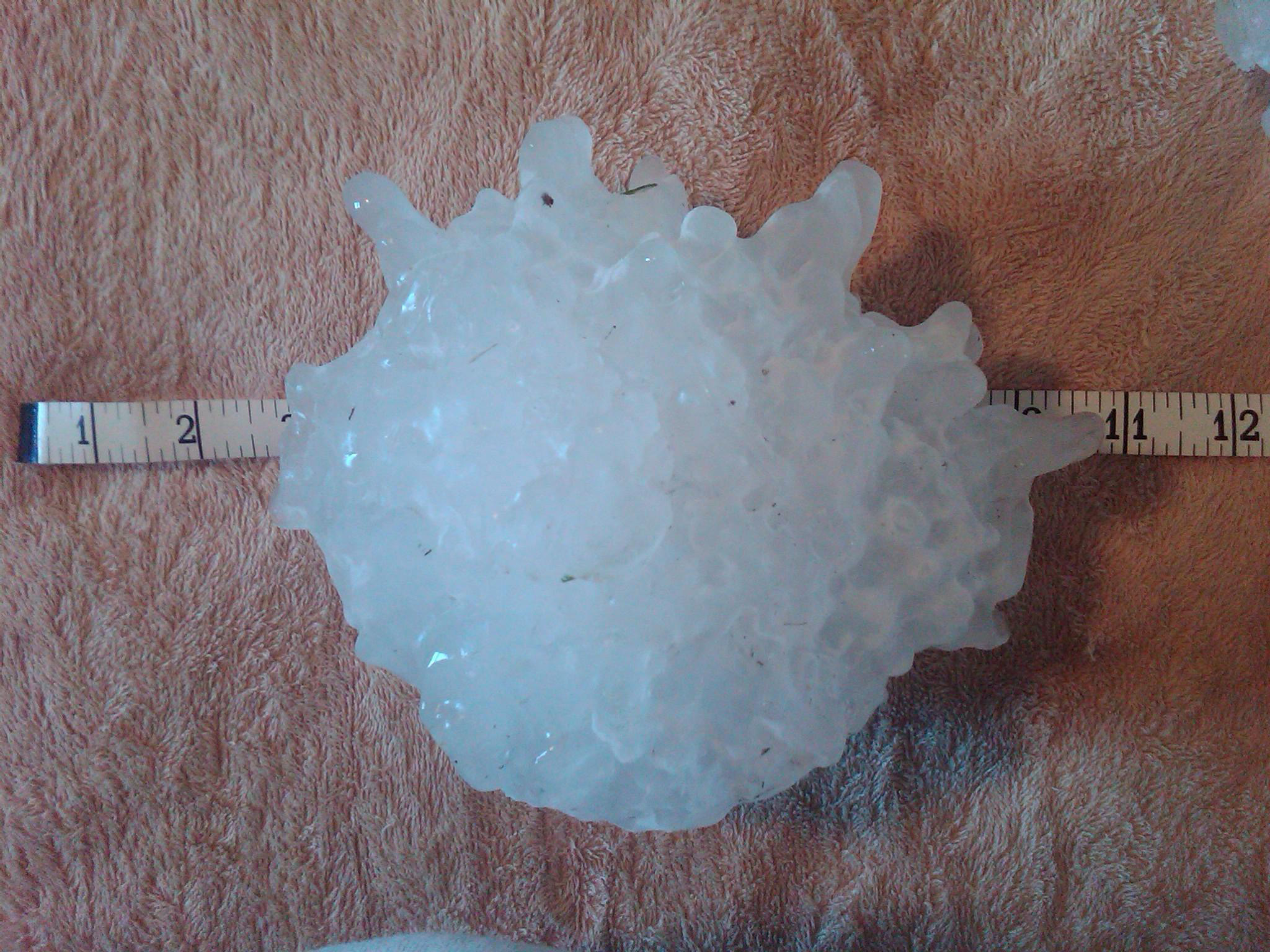
Record hailstone in Vivian, July 2010

== World record hailstone ==
Vivian holds the world record for largest measured hailstone. On July 23, 2010, a hailstone measuring 8 inches (200 mm) in diameter, 18.62 inches (473 mm) in circumference, and 1.93 pounds (0.88 kg) in weight, fell during a severe storm that hit the town. This broke the record held by a hailstone that fell in Aurora, Nebraska, in 2003.

== Transportation ==
Intercity bus service to the community is provided by Jefferson Lines.

== See also ==
- List of census-designated places in South Dakota
