= KOZY (AM) =

Coordinates: 47°10′22″N 93°27′10″W

- Grand Rapids, Minnesota; United States
- Broadcast area: Iron Range
- Frequency: 1320 kHz
- Branding: 1320 KOZY

Programming
- Format: Commercial; Oldies/Sports/Talk
- Affiliations: ABC News Radio; Minnesota Timberwolves; Minnesota Twins; Minnesota Wild; Minnesota News Network

Ownership
- Owner: Steve Hallstrom and Scott Hennen; (Rapids Radio LLC)
- Sister stations: KMFY, KBAJ

History
- First air date: January 29, 1948
- Former call signs: KBZY (1948-1954)
- Former frequencies: 1490 kHz (1948-1976)
- Call sign meaning: Comfy Cozy

Technical information
- Licensing authority: FCC
- Facility ID: 34971
- Class: B
- Power: 5,000 watts
- Translator: 93.1 K226CV (Grand Rapids)

Links
- Public license information: Public file; LMS
- Webcast: Listen Live
- Website: kozyradio.com

KOZY (1320 kHz) is an oldies AM radio station in Grand Rapids, Minnesota. It is owned by Steve Hallstrom and Scott Hennen, through licensee Rapids Radio LLC, along with its sister stations, KMFY and KBAJ.

== History ==
The Federal Communications Commission (FCC) authorized Itasca Broadcasting Corporation in 1947 to construct a full-time radio station in Grand Rapids on 1490 kHz with 250 watts. The corporation's founding group consisted of Robert D. Kennedy, formerly sales manager of WSBR in Superior, Wisconsin, and Grand Rapids-area business figures Larke Huntley, Harry Erickson, William King, Robert Dingman and Walter Kurtz.

The station began broadcasting as KBZY in January 1948. Itasca Broadcasting operated KBZY from North First Avenue in Grand Rapids. The call sign was changed to KOZY in December 1954. A 1964 industry directory continued to list Kennedy as general manager and identified KOZY as an affiliate of the Mutual and Keystone networks.

KOZY initially operated with 250 watts both day and night. In December 1965, the FCC granted a construction permit increasing its daytime power to 1,000 watts while retaining 250-watt nighttime operation. The upgraded facility was licensed in early 1966.

Itasca Broadcasting applied in 1975 to move KOZY from 1490 to 1320 kHz, increase its power to 5,000 watts full-time and construct a directional nighttime antenna system at a new transmitter site southeast of Grand Rapids. The FCC granted program operating authority for the rebuilt facility effective October 13, 1976, establishing KOZY's present frequency and power. By that year, Kennedy owned 99.2 percent of the station.

In 1979, the FCC approved the assignment of KOZY from Itasca Broadcasting to Sorenson Broadcasting Corporation for $375,000, plus $25,000 for a noncompetition agreement. Sorenson Broadcasting was owned equally by Dean P. Sorenson and Thomas J. Simmons. Sorenson sold KOZY in 1986 for $375,000 to Kirwin Broadcasting, owned by William J. and Carla Kirwin. William Kirwin was then KOZY's general manager.

By 2001, the National Radio Club AM Radio Log listed KOZY with an oldies format and affiliations with ABC and the Minnesota News Network. Following William Kirwin's death, an application was filed in 2002 to transfer control of Kirwin Broadcasting, which by then owned both KOZY and KMFY. Michael and Cynthia Iaizzo, each of whom already held 13 percent of the company, acquired the remaining interests from two trusts controlled by Carla Kirwin for $1.5 million and became equal owners. By 2005, the FCC listed Itasca Broadcasting, Inc., as KOZY's licensee.

Itasca Broadcasting sold KOZY and KMFY to Jim and Colleen Lamke's Lamke Broadcasting in 2012 for $1.25 million. In 2019, KOZY added the 250-watt FM translator K226CV on 93.1 MHz. The translator, authorized through the FCC's AM revitalization program, extended the station's service into several communities in the western Iron Range. At the time, KOZY was carrying a full-service oldies format.

Lamke Broadcasting agreed in 2021 to sell KOZY, K226CV, KMFY and KBAJ to Steven Hallstrom and Scott Hennen's Rapids Radio LLC for $1.4 million. The FCC approved the transaction that September, and Rapids Radio assumed ownership on November 1, 2021. Rapids Radio describes KOZY as a locally presented classic hits and information station, combining music with local news and sports programming.

== The Super Cruiser ==
The Super Cruiser is KOZY's promotional vehicle used in parades and on location reporting. Originally a 1971 Chevy Ambulance, It was retired and sold to KNNS-FM (Now KOZY's sister station, KMFY). The Super Cruiser has had many color schemes over the years including Yellow, 2 tone blue, and the current black.

== Programming ==
KOZY AM 1320 is a live, local, locally produced radio station.

KOZY is the Grand Rapids area affiliate for the ABC Information Network, with hourly news updates from ABC, and ABC Sports reports. KOZY is also an affiliate of the Minnesota News Network with hourly newscasts of statewide news, generally at the bottom of each hour. MNN also provides several Minnesota sports programs throughout the day. KOZY also airs local area-based news hourly from 6am to 5pm.

KOZY broadcasts games for the Minnesota Twins, Minnesota Timberwolves, Minnesota Golden Gophers (college), Minnesota Wild. The Minnesota Vikings NFL Football Games air on sister station, KMFY.

KOZY is also the longtime flagship station of Grand Rapids High School sports. They also feature "Thunderhawk Talk", a program of news from Grand Rapids High School. Grand Rapids High School hockey will be heard on KOZY's sister station, KBAJ in 2018.

KOZY airs syndicated programming including "Little Known Facts" with Chaz Allan, "American Hit List" with M.G. Kelly, as well as the "Twilight Zone".

KOZY's music programming features the hit songs of the mid-1950s through the mid-1970s. A music library of literally thousands of musical selections provides a very wide music base generally exceeding that of typical "oldies" radio stations.
