= Independent School District 318 =

School district located in Itasca County, Minnesota, U.S.

Address
- 820 Northwest 1st Avenue Grand Rapids, Minnesota, 55744; United States

District information
- Type: Public
- Grades: PreK–12
- NCES District ID: 2713170

Students and staff
- Students: 3,964 (2020–2021)
- Teachers: 254.61 (on an FTE basis)
- Staff: 306.45 (on an FTE basis)
- Student–teacher ratio: 15.57:1

Other information
- Website: www.isd318.org

Independent School District 318 is a school district located in Itasca County, Minnesota, United States, that operates public primary and secondary schools within the district. The district serves the communities of Balsam, Bigfork, Cohasset, Effie, Grand Rapids, Squaw Lake, Togo, Warba and Wawina. The current superintendent is Matt Grose who was hired in 2020.

== Schools ==
- Grand Rapids High School
- Bigfork School (K-12 School)
- Robert J. Elkington Middle School
- Cohasset Elementary
- East Rapids Elementary
- West Rapids Elementary

== ISD 318 School Board ==
- Chairman- Pat Medure
- Clerk- Molly Miskovich
- Treasurer- Malissa Bahr
- Director- Sue Zeige
- Director- David Marty
- Director- Mindy Nuhring

== See also ==
- List of school districts in Minnesota
