= KMFY =

Coordinates: 47.255°N 93.434°W

- Grand Rapids, Minnesota; United States
- Broadcast area: Itasca County, Iron Range
- Frequency: 96.9 MHz
- RDS: PI: A34A; PS: KMFY FM; RT: KMFY FM Grand Rapids Minnesota
- Branding: 96.9 KMFY

Programming
- Format: Adult Contemporary
- Affiliations: ABC News Radio; Minnesota News Network; Minnesota Vikings; Westwood One

Ownership
- Owner: Steve Hallstrom and Scott Hennen; (Rapids Radio LLC)
- Sister stations: KOZY, KBAJ

History
- First air date: December 5, 1975 (as KXGR at 96.7)
- Former call signs: KXGR (1975–1981); KNNS (1981–1989); KFMY-FM (December 4–21, 1989); KMFY-FM (December 21, 1989–February 28, 1990)
- Former frequencies: 96.7 MHz (1975–1981)
- Call sign meaning: Comfy Cozy

Technical information
- Licensing authority: FCC
- Facility ID: 34972
- Class: C1
- ERP: 100,000 watts
- HAAT: 152.4 meters (500 ft)

Links
- Public license information: Public file; LMS
- Webcast: Listen Live
- Website: kmfyradio.com

KMFY (96.9 FM) is a radio station licensed to Grand Rapids, Minnesota. KMFY covers the counties of Itasca, Aitkin, Cass and western St. Louis, and broadcasts an Adult Contemporary music format with a mix of local weather, sports, local news, and community events.

== History ==
The station has been an adult contemporary music station ever since its start as KXGR. The station itself was later sold to Bill and Carla Kirwin in 1989 by Mike and Mary Ives. It was briefly renamed KFMY-FM but became KMFY-FM within a few weeks in December 1989. In 2001, the station was sold to Mike and Cindy Iaizzo who renamed it Itasca Broadcasting. In 2012, KMFY-FM was sold to Jim and Colleen Lamke, who renamed it Lamke Broadcasting. Effective November 1, 2021, Lamke Broadcasting announced it had sold KMFY including its sister stations KBAJ and KOZY including FM translator K226CV 93.1 to Steve Hallstrom and Scott Hennen, through their licensee Rapids Radio LLC. KMFY is a sister station to KOZY and KBAJ.

Sometime in 2023, KMFY removed all music from the 1980s, a majority of 1990s, and 2000s music from its main playlist, making it lean more towards a Hot AC station. KMFY plays ’80s music on Friday nights with the syndicated Backtrax USA ’80s Edition. KMFY is affiliated with ABC News, Local Radio Networks, Minnesota News Network, Weatherology Weather Center, Vikings Radio Network, and Westwood One. As of 2024 KMFY returned a majority of its ’80s music back into its main playlist.
