= Norman Rudolph Prahl =

American politician (1919–1996)

Norman Prahl
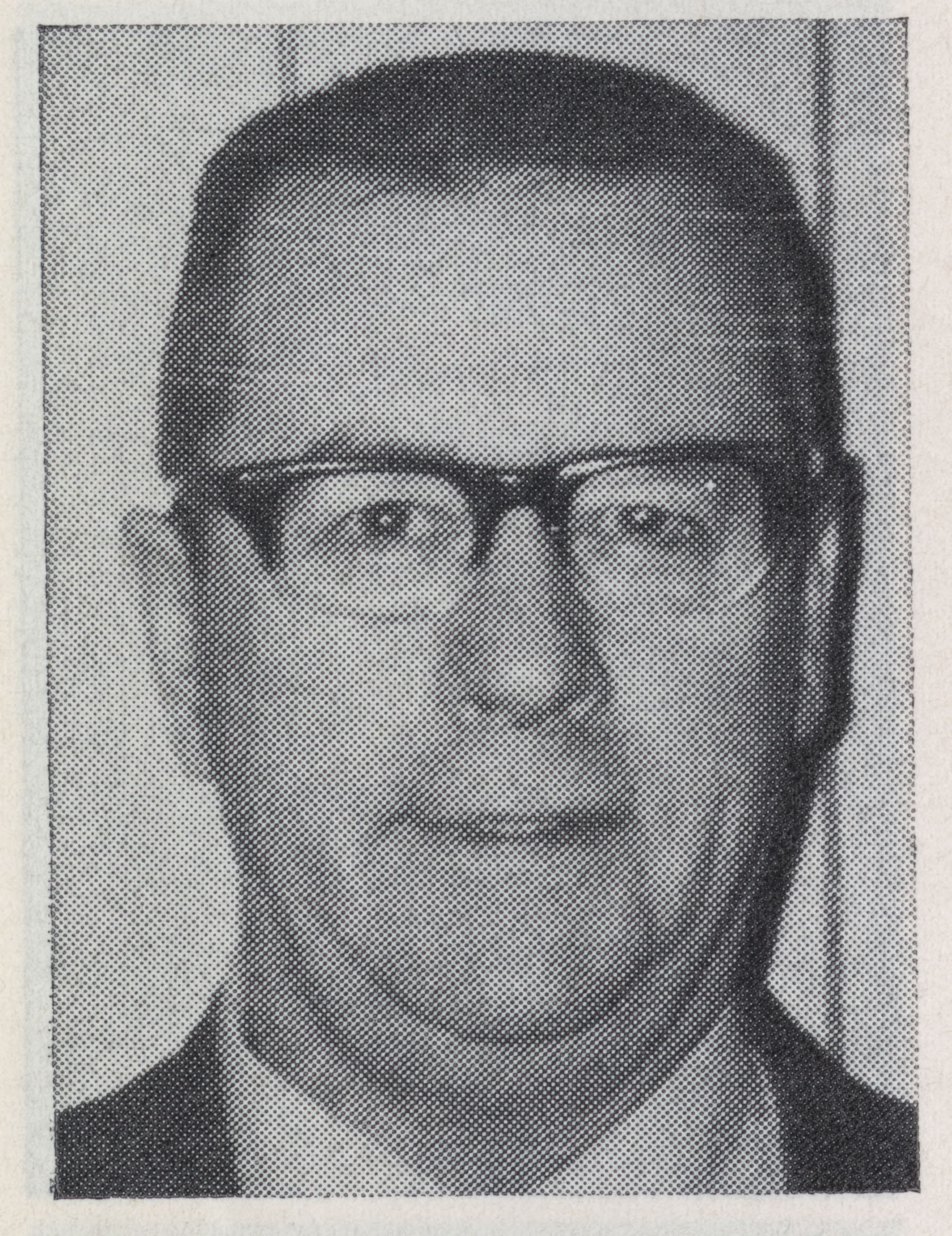
- Prahl c. 1973

Member of the Minnesota House of Representatives from the 58B and 03B Districts
- In office January 4, 1971 – January 4, 1981
- Governor: Wendell R. Anderson; Rudy Perpich; Al Quie

Personal details
- Born: July 20, 1919 Vivian, South Dakota, U.S.
- Died: June 7, 1996 (aged 76) Grand Rapids, Minnesota, U.S.
- Resting place: Itasca Calvary Cemetery, Grand Rapids, Minnesota, U.S.
- Other political affiliations: Democrat (DFL)

Norman Rudolph Prahl (July 20, 1919 – June 7, 1996) was an American politician.

Prahl was born in Vivian, South Dakota. He lived in Grand Rapids, Minnesota with his wife and family. Prahl was involved with farming, ranching, and mining. Prahl served as a Minnesota township supervisor. He also served in the Minnesota House of Representatives from 1971 to 1980 and was a Democrat. He died at the Itasca Medical Center in Grand Rapids Minnesota.
