= Itasca County Historical Society =

County museum in Grand Rapids, Minnesota

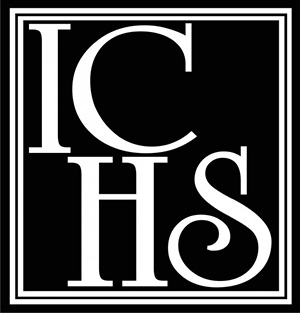

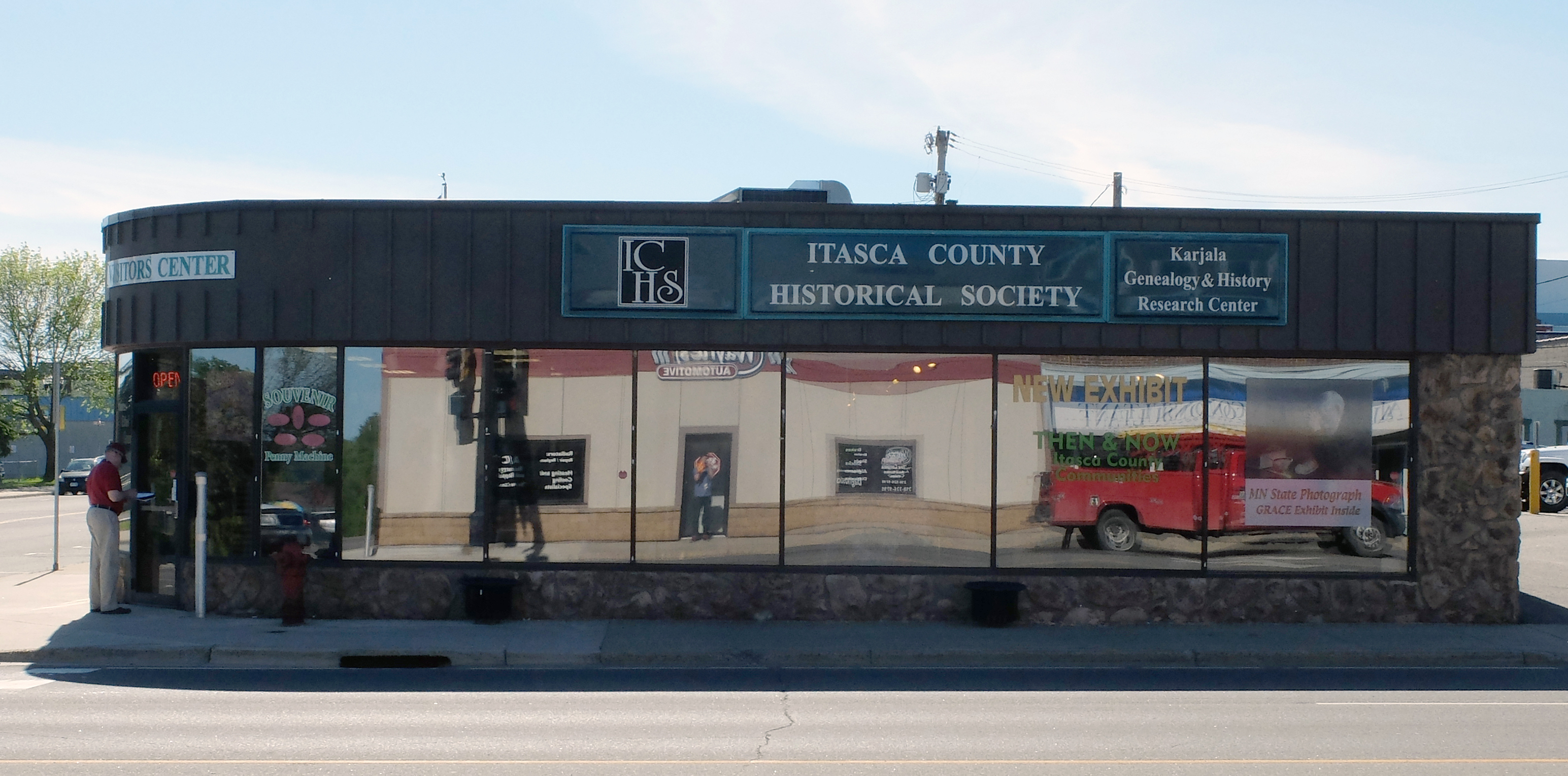
- Established: 1934
- Location: 201 N Pokegama Ave, Grand Rapids, Minnesota, United States
- Coordinates: 47.234167°N 93.528889°W
- Type: Local history
- Executive director: Lilah Crowe
- Website: itascahistorical.org/

The Itasca County Historical Society is a non-profit organization in Grand Rapids, Minnesota dedicated to preserving Itasca County, Minnesota's history. Their mission emphasizes understanding the present through knowledge of the past.

== Museum and Research Center ==
The society operates the Itasca Heritage Center located in the former Corcoran Building, in Grand Rapids, Minnesota which features exhibits on various aspects of Itasca County's history, including life at the turn of the century, logging and mining industries, immigration and homesteading, Native American history, the Judy Garland story, and the "Picture of Grace" exhibit which details the story behind Minnesota's state photograph. The museum also has a research center named the Karjala Research Genealogy and History Center.

== Programming ==
ICHS offers various programs for the community. The museum has changing annual exhibits and educational programs. The Society also maintains a gift shop selling local crafts and books, and a unique penny machine featuring Itasca County icons. They also have an escape room that provides a way to learn about local history. The Society offers educational programs specifically geared towards students.

== See also ==
- List of museums in Minnesota
