= Squaw Lake, Minnesota =

City in Minnesota, United States

Squaw Lake, Minnesota Gaa-waawiyegamaag (Ojibwe)
- City
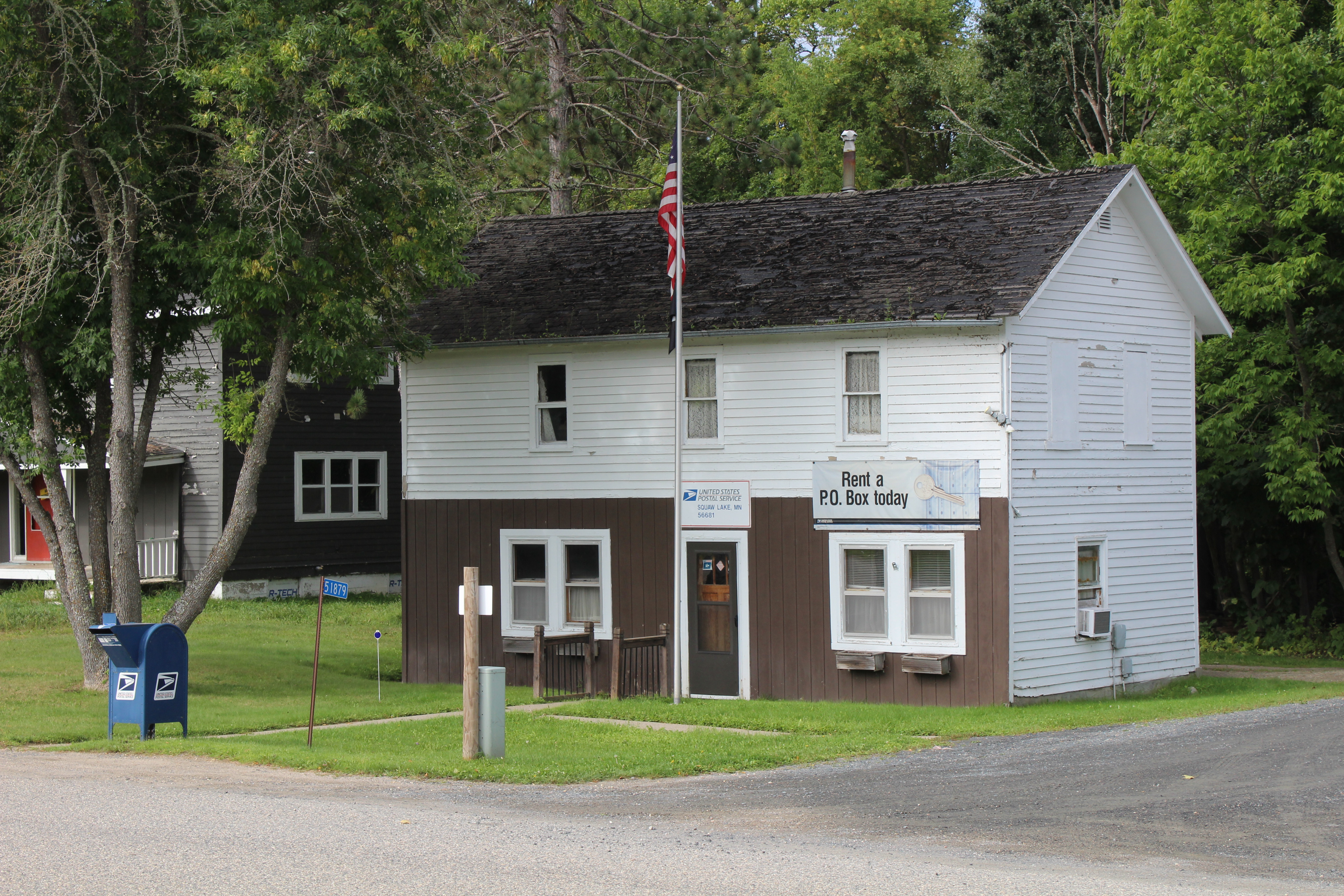
- Post office

- Location of the city of Squaw Lake within Itasca County, Minnesota
- Coordinates: 47°37′43″N 94°8′20″W
- Country: United States
- State: Minnesota
- County: Itasca
- Incorporated: December 17, 1940

Government
  - Mayor: Joan Lecuyer

Area
  - Total: 0.842 sq mi (2.180 km^{2})
  - Land: 0.810 sq mi (2.097 km^{2})
  - Water: 0.032 sq mi (0.083 km^{2})
- Elevation: 1,339 ft (408 m)

Population (2020)
  - Total: 98
  - Estimate (2022): 98
  - Density: 121.0/sq mi (46.72/km^{2})
- Time zone: UTC−6 (Central (CST))
  - Summer (DST): UTC−5 (CDT)
- ZIP Code: 56681
- Area code: 218
- FIPS code: 27-62284
- GNIS feature ID: 0658441
- Sales tax: 7.875%

Squaw Lake (/ˈskwɔː/ SKWAW, Ojibwe: Gaa-waawiyegamaag) is a city in Itasca County, Minnesota, United States. The population was 98 at the 2020 census.

The town center is located along Minnesota State Highway 46. A significant portion of the economy can be attributed to fishing and hunting-related tourism.

== History ==
The Squaw Lake area was inhabited by Ojibwe people prior to the arrival of European colonizers. The land was set aside for the Leech Lake Band of Ojibwe in 19th century treaties as part of the Leech Lake Indian Reservation. Early on it was a hub for fur traders and loggers. It was later the site of a Great Northern Railway station. A post office was established there by 1923 and it was incorporated as a village in 1940.

The lake located to the east of the town was renamed from Squaw Lake to Nature's Lake in 1995 by the Minnesota Legislature following a campaign led by students from Cass Lake-Bena High School. The term "squaw" is an sexually charged ethnic slur. The Leech Lake Name Change Committee attempted to introduce a referendum on changing the town's name in November 2000, but did not have enough valid signatures for its petition.

== Geography ==
Squaw Lake is located on the Leech Lake Indian Reservation, between Round Lake and Nature's Lake. According to the United States Census Bureau, the city has a total area of 0.840 square miles (2.18 km^{2}), of which 0.810 square miles (2.10 km^{2}) is land and 0.030 square miles (0.08 km^{2}) is water.

== Education ==
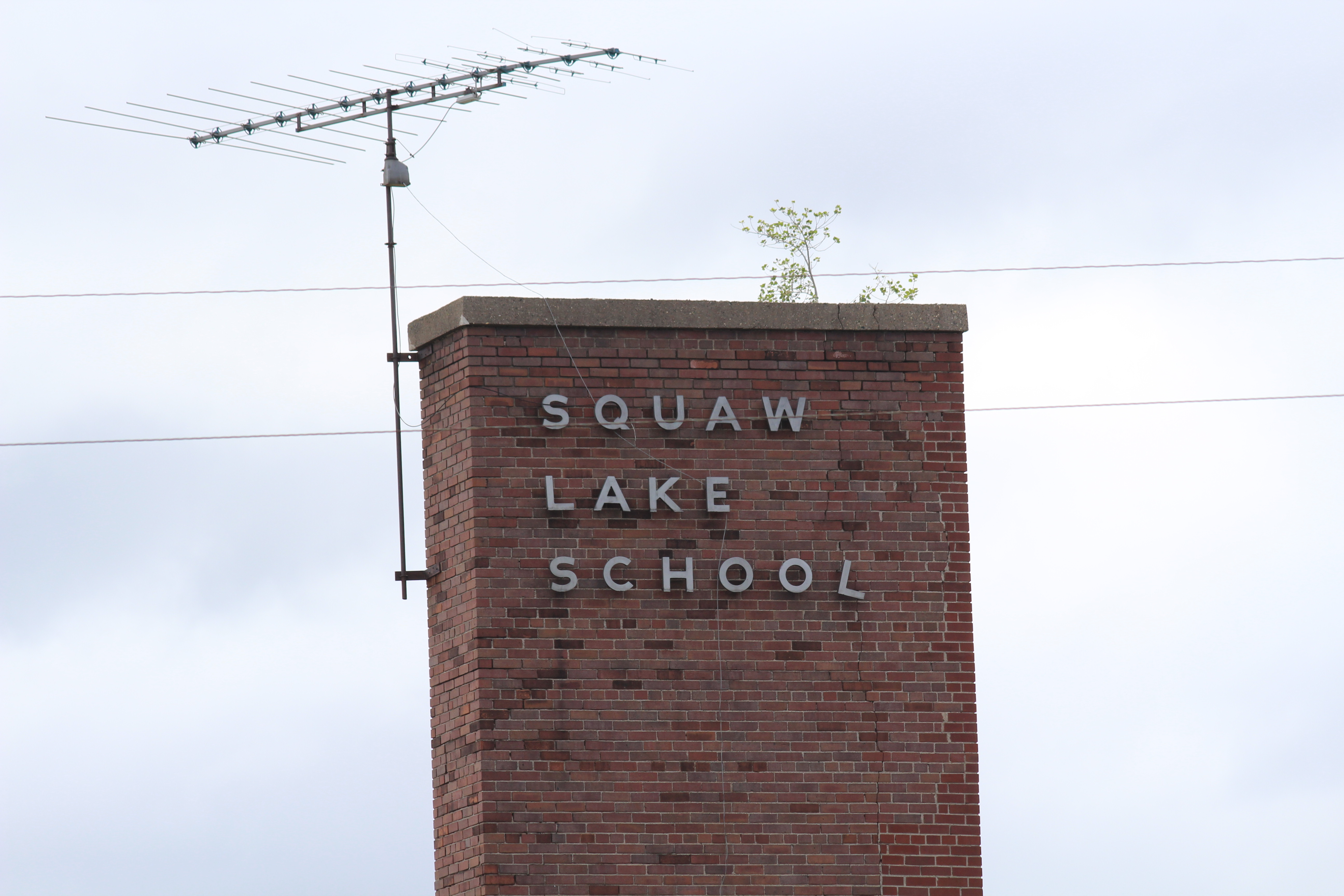
Squaw Lake School, Squaw Lake, Minnesota

Independent School District 318 serves the city.

== Demographics ==
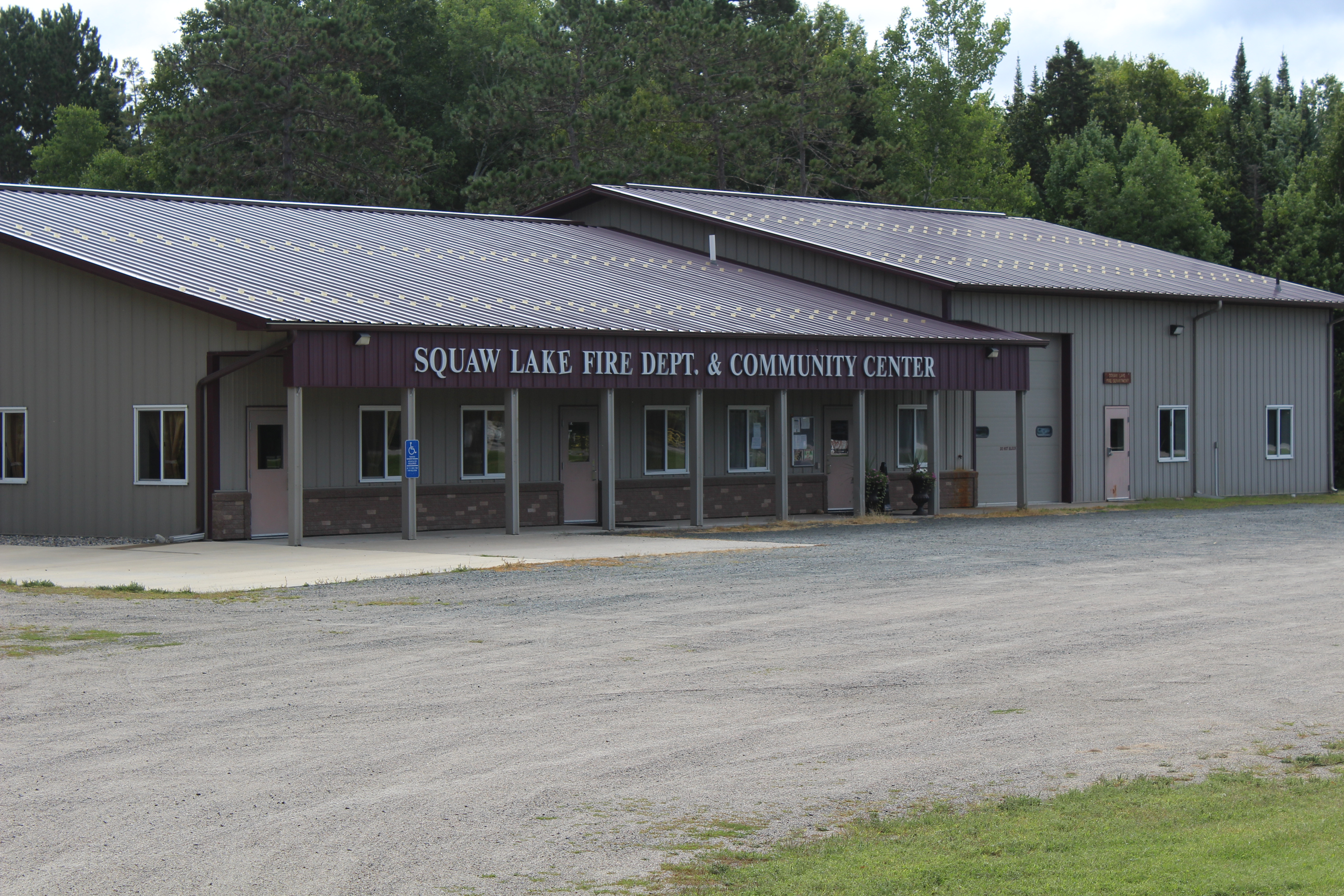
Fire Department and Community Center

Historical population
Census	Pop.	Note	%±
1950	132		—
1960	129		−2.3%
1970	113		−12.4%
1980	162		43.4%
1990	139		−14.2%
2000	99		−28.8%
2010	107		8.1%
2020	98		−8.4%
2022 (est.)	98		0.0%
U.S. Decennial Census; 2020 Census

=== 2010 census ===
As of the 2010 census, there were 107 people, 39 households, and 26 families living in the city. The population density was 133.8 inhabitants per square mile (51.7/km^{2}). There were 63 housing units at an average density of 78.8 per square mile (30.4/km^{2}). The racial makeup of the city was 46.7% White, 51.4% Native American, 0.9% Asian, and 0.9% from two or more races.

There were 39 households, of which 41.0% had children under the age of 18 living with them, 35.9% were married couples living together, 28.2% had a female householder with no husband present, 2.6% had a male householder with no wife present, and 33.3% were non-families. 23.1% of all households were made up of individuals, and 7.7% had someone living alone who was 65 years of age or older. The average household size was 2.74 and the average family size was 3.23.

The median age in the city was 35.9 years. 29.9% of residents were under the age of 18; 6.5% were between the ages of 18 and 24; 28.9% were from 25 to 44; 18.8% were from 45 to 64; and 15.9% were 65 years of age or older. The gender makeup of the city was 50.5% male and 49.5% female.

=== 2000 census ===
As of the 2000 census, there were 99 people, 35 households, and 21 families living in the city. The population density was 120.7 inhabitants per square mile (46.6/km^{2}). There were 56 housing units at an average density of 68.2 per square mile (26.3/km^{2}). The racial makeup of the city was 63.64% Native American, 31.31% White, 1.01% Asian, and 4.04% from two or more races. Hispanic or Latino of any race were 1.01% of the population.

There were 35 households, out of which 34.3% had children under the age of 18 living with them, 31.4% were married couples living together, 22.9% had a female householder with no husband present, and 40.0% were non-families. 31.4% of all households were made up of individuals, and 20.0% had someone living alone who was 65 years of age or older. The average household size was 2.83 and the average family size was 3.76.

In the city, the population was spread out, with 38.4% under the age of 18, 10.1% from 18 to 24, 23.2% from 25 to 44, 16.2% from 45 to 64, and 12.1% who were 65 years of age or older. The median age was 26 years. For every 100 females, there were 98.0 males. For every 100 females age 18 and over, there were 79.4 males.

The median income for a household in the city was $11,875, and the median income for a family was $31,250. Males had a median income of $12,000 versus $20,000 for females. The per capita income for the city was $9,895. There were 42.1% of families and 49.5% of the population living below the poverty line, including 64.0% of under eighteens and 50.0% of those over 64.
