= Grand Rapids High School =

Coordinates: 47.2483333°N 93.5438889°W

Location
- 800 Conifer Dr NW; Grand Rapids, Minnesota 55744; United States

Information
- Type: Public Secondary
- Principal: Darrin Hofstad
- Teaching staff: 55.99 (FTE)
- Grades: 9–12
- Enrollment: 1,091 (2024–2025)
- Student to teacher ratio: 19.49
- Colors: Orange and black
- Mascot: Thunderhawk
- Radio: "Hawk Talk"
- Website: https://grhs.isd318.org/

Grand Rapids High School is a four-year public high school located in Grand Rapids, Minnesota, United States, on 800 Conifer Drive. GRHS offers a wide range of extracurricular activities, and has one of the few competitive field show marching band programs north of Minneapolis/St. Paul, Minnesota.

GRHS' Student Council and the school facility served as the host of the 2010 Minnesota Student Council State Convention in April. The Theme was "Survivor Northwoods: Leadership By Nature"

== Overview ==
Grand Rapids High School, "GRHS", is one of the two high schools in Independent School District 318. The school was founded in 1895. The school was the first in Northern Minnesota to offer courses in the International Baccalaureate program, and as of 2008 offered the University of Minnesota's College in the Schools Program, and Project Lead the Way, a project in conjunction with the Itasca Community College. GRHS's school song is the "Rapids Rouser".

Similar to other northern Minnesota high schools, GRHS has two homecomings: the traditional Fall Homecoming for American football and a winter homecoming for ice hockey. The school also has a "Spring Fling", similar to a homecoming week. All three events are usually a week long, with a different dress-up theme each day, with Friday being Orange & Black (the school colors) Day. Friday also commonly has a shortened class schedule with a pep fest in the morning.

On October 5, 1966, 15-year-old David Black, killed school administrator Forrest Willey and seriously wounded fellow student, 14-year-old Kevin Roth. Black was tried as a juvenile and released after serving 5 years in prison.

== Technical education ==
GRHS has a technical education center with much equipment, from a CAD computer lab to a CNC plasma cutter, CNC Router, CNC Lathe, and 3D Printer for making computer-designed parts.

== Athletics ==
As of 2024 all of the schools athletics were under the direction of activities director Dale Christy. Anne Campbell retired from the post of athletic director in 2023.

== Notable alumni ==
- Jon Casey, professional ice hockey goalie
- Spencer Igo, member of the Minnesota House of Representatives
- Hunter Shepard, professional ice hockey goalie
- Alex Goligoski, professional ice hocky defenceman
