= KBAJ =

Coordinates: 47°20′22″N 93°23′49″W

KBAJ-FM
- Deer River, Minnesota; United States
- Broadcast area: Iron Range
- Frequency: 105.5 MHz
- RDS: PI: 12AD; PS: Title by Artist; RT: J105 The Thunder KBAJ
- Branding: J105 The Thunder

Programming
- Format: Classic rock
- Affiliations: ABC News Radio

Ownership
- Owner: Scott Hennen and Steven Hallstrom; (Rapids Radio LLC)
- Sister stations: KMFY, KOZY

History
- First air date: 1999

Technical information
- Licensing authority: FCC
- Facility ID: 26005
- Class: C1
- ERP: 100,000 watts
- HAAT: 155 meters (509 ft)

Links
- Public license information: Public file; LMS
- Webcast: Listen Live
- Website: J105 Online

KBAJ (105.5 FM, "J105 The Thunder") is a classic rock radio station licensed to Deer Rive, through licensee Rapids Radio LLC.

The radio station went on-air in 1999. Originally owned by Red Rock Radio Corp., it was a KQDS-FM simulcast. On January 1, 2017, KBAJ was sold by Red Rock Radio Corp. to Lamke Broadcasting and rebranded as "J105 The Thunder", still keeping the classic rock format. The sale, at a price of $200,000, was consummated on March

In the winter of 2017, KBAJ became the broadcast home for championship Grand Rapids High School hockey.

KOZY and KMFY are also owned by Rapids Radio.
