= Postpartum care =

Care provided to women after childbirth

Postnatal care

Postpartum care or postnatal care is a service provided to individuals in the postpartum period, to help with postpartum recuperation and restoration. Additionally, the service aids in the transition to parenthood while mitigating any health risks. In the United States, about two‑thirds of pregnancy‑related deaths occur during the postpartum period, most of which are considered preventable; barriers such as fragmented care and lapses in insurance coverage contribute to these risks.

== Traditional postpartum care ==
Many traditional forms of postpartum confinement exist throughout the world. A 2007 qualitative systematic review examining practices across more than 20 countries found common themes including organized support for the new mother, prescribed periods of rest, specific dietary practices, hygiene rituals, and infant care guidance — allowing the mother to be "mothered" during recovery. Chinese Zuo Yuezi (sitting the month), Nigerian omugwo, European Lying-in, Korean Sanhujori, Japanese satogaeri bunben (returning to the natal home), and Latin American cuarentena are well-documented examples.

Sanhujori is Korea's version of postpartum care. It draws on principles that emphasize activities and foods that keep the body warm, rested, and relaxed to maximize the body's return to its normal state, maintaining cleanliness, eating nutritious foods, and peace of mind and heart. The confinement period is known as samchil-il (three seven days).

In Colombia, new mothers in a process called dieta are traditionally told to avoid sunlight and imbibe sancocho and hot chocolate for 40 days. Before reentering her normal routine, she takes a bath of water and herbs.

In Japan, the tradition of satogaeri bunben (里帰り分娩) involves a woman returning to her parents' home for several weeks before and after childbirth to receive care from her own mother. This practice remains common in contemporary Japan, though the country has also developed a formal Postpartum Care Program offering three service types: short-term residential stays, daytime care, and home visits by midwives for up to 16 weeks after delivery.

In Singapore, postpartum confinement practices are observed across all three major ethnic groups, though with distinct cultural variations. A study of 1,247 women found that 96.4% of Chinese mothers, 92.4% of Malay mothers, and 85.6% of Indian mothers followed some form of confinement practices. Chinese mothers were significantly more likely to hire a professional confinement nanny, while Malay mothers more commonly used traditional massage therapy, and Indian mothers relied primarily on their own mothers or mothers-in-law for support.

In Malaysia, the postpartum confinement period is known as berpantang. A cross-sectional study at a rural maternal and child health clinic found that 66.2% of women followed traditional and complementary practices during the postpartum period, with most reporting that these practices were aimed at improving general well-being.

Traditionally, women were cared for by their elders: their mother, mother-in-law, sister, or aunt. The lying-in hospitals provided an institutional variation that gave women weeks of bed rest and a respite from household chores. Increasingly, these older women are unavailable or unwilling to take on this role; given the lingering effects of the one-child policy, many older Chinese women had limited experience of newborn babies, having only had one themselves. Replacements for this familial help are commercial services, both in the home and at residential centres.

== Modern commercial versions ==
=== At home ===
Agencies provide specialist carers who come to the new parents' home. This job used to be known as the monthly nurse, as she came and lived with the family for a month. Now more common terms are maternity nurse, newborn care specialist, or confinement nanny; the worker is not a registered health care professional, such as the word "nurse" usually implies in current English. In Indian English the role is called a "japa maid".

A doula is best known as a birth companion, but some provide practical and emotional post-birth support. A lactation consultant and a health visitor are trained health professionals who may assist the new mother at this time. In the Netherlands, the in-home support is known as kraamzorg, and standard within the national health insurance system.

The use of yue sao, a specialist carer translated in Canada as "postpartum doula", is also very common in China. Yue sao typically are live-in domestic helpers who care for both the new mother and baby for the first month after birth. Salaries as at 2017 vary from RMB8000 to RMB20000 per month depending on city and experience. They are described as "mothering the mother". Australian documentary-maker Aela Callan called them "Chinese supermums" but says they are colloquially known as "confinement ladies".

=== Residential facilities ===
Companies have sprung up to offer extended postpartum care outside the home, sometimes in a hotel-like environment. Luxury options are a business. Private postpartum care centres were introduced to Korea in 1996 under the name of sanhujoriwon. A 2023 government survey found that approximately 90% of Korean mothers now use sanhujoriwon, with maternal health recovery cited as the primary purpose by 91.2% of users. Research on maternal outcomes at these facilities has found high levels of satisfaction, with partnership between mothers and care staff and the education support systems provided being the strongest predictors of positive experiences. A quasi-experimental study also found that structured maternal role adjustment programs implemented within sanhujoriwon improved breastfeeding success and maternal role confidence among first-time mothers. Within the Chinese tradition, specialist businesses such as Red Wall Confinement Centre charge up to $27,000 for one month. In Taiwan, postpartum nursing centres are popular, for those who can afford them.

Birth tourism centres operating under the radar in the United States for Chinese women offer "sitting the month".

Additionally, women will often visit obstetricians, gynecologists, pediatricians, lactation consultants, and/or research staff for care and advice during postpartum.

=== Industry growth and commercialization ===
The postpartum care center industry has expanded significantly since the early 2000s, growing from its origins in East Asia to Western countries. A 2024 analysis identified four stages of industry development globally: the country of geographical origin (China), countries with cultural adaptation and strong policy support (such as South Korea and Taiwan), countries with cultural adaptation but weaker regulatory frameworks, and countries where the industry primarily serves diaspora Chinese communities. In China, the postpartum care market grew from 9.3 billion yuan in 2018 to 22.3 billion yuan (approximately US$3.1 billion) in 2022, driven by rising urban incomes and demand for professional newborn and maternal care services. The professionalization of postpartum care has also been observed outside institutional settings, with the yue sao (confinement nanny) profession in China experiencing rapid growth and expanding to serve Chinese diaspora communities in Europe and North America. In Taiwan, postpartum care centers are popular among people with financial means.

== Government-funded postpartum home care ==
Several countries have established publicly funded systems of postpartum home visits, in contrast to the predominantly private or family-based models found elsewhere. A 2024 comparative study of six high-income countries found that all countries except the United States offer universal at-home postnatal visits, with significant variation in the duration, intensity, and type of provider involved.

In the Netherlands, kraamzorg (maternity care) is a universal entitlement covered by basic health insurance. A qualified maternity nurse (kraamverzorgster) provides in-home care for up to 8 to 10 days following birth, with a standard allocation of 49 hours that can be extended based on clinical need. The kraamverzorgster monitors the health of both mother and newborn, assists with breastfeeding, and provides practical household support. This system results in one of the most comprehensive postpartum home care programs among high-income countries.

In Japan, the Postpartum Care Program provides subsidized services through three delivery models: short-term residential stays, daytime daycare, and home visits by midwives for up to 16 weeks after delivery. Costs are shared between the national government and local municipalities, with user co-payments determined by local conditions and household income.

In Switzerland, midwives may conduct up to 16 home visits after a first birth and 10 after subsequent births, within the first 56 days postpartum. These visits are reimbursed through the national health insurance system. Switzerland maintains a comparatively large midwifery workforce, with approximately 33 midwives per 1,000 live births, compared to an estimated 4 per 1,000 in the United States.

In Germany, all women are entitled to home visits by a freelance midwife during the postpartum period. However, a 2023 analysis of health insurance data from nearly 200,000 births found significant socioeconomic disparities in access: 90.5% of high-income women received postpartum midwife home visits, compared to only 67.9% of low-income women, despite similar clinical profiles across income groups.

A Cochrane systematic review of home-visiting schedules in the early postpartum period found that increased frequency of home visits was associated with reduced infant hospital readmissions, higher rates of exclusive breastfeeding, and greater maternal satisfaction with postnatal care.

== Effectiveness ==
Access to comprehensive health insurance has been associated with higher rates of postpartum visit attendance, as well as lower rates of preventable hospital readmissions and emergency department use during the postpartum period. These findings suggest that structural healthcare coverage plays a significant role in promoting continuity of postpartum care.

Outcomes during the postpartum period that have received the most research attention include breastfeeding, greater attendance at postpartum visits, readmissions and emergency room visits, anxiety and depression, oral glucose tolerance testing, hemoglobin A1c testing and contraceptive use.

Based on the 2023 meta-analysis conducted by the Patient-Centered Outcomes Research Institute, in the United States more comprehensive health insurance is likely associated with greater attendance at postpartum visits and may be associated with fewer preventable readmissions and emergency room visits.

Research into modern postpartum care strategies in the U.S. and Canada has focused on comparative effectiveness of different care delivery models, analyzing where, how, when, and who provides care, and the impact of health insurance coverage extensions.

Further research explores the management of postpartum hypertension, including the use of home blood pressure monitoring, pharmacological treatments, and magnesium sulfate regimens for preeclampsia, with emphasis on addressing disparities in care access and outcomes relating to race, ethnicity, and social determinants of health.

Nearly 80% of current studies focus on specific intervention targets of postpartum care. More research is needed to look into the profound topic of general postpartum care.

=== General postpartum visits ===
Evidence suggests that postpartum visits from home or by telephone, compared to at the clinic, are associated with similar levels of depression or anxiety symptoms up to 1-year post pregnancy.

There is also no reliable evidence that integration of care across multiple types of providers has an impact on depression symptoms or substance use up to 1 year post-pregnancy.

A 2023 systematic review of postpartum care, up to a year after pregnancy, concluded that more comprehensive healthcare coverage was associated with high attendance rates for scheduled postpartum visits. There is not reliable evidence of the effect of attendance for postpartum visits on maternal and child outcomes.

A 2021 randomized controlled trial (RCT) observed that postpartum mothers who are visited by human service professionals or public health nurses were more likely to begin breastfeeding and breastfeed longer than those who received no home visits.

=== Contraceptive care ===
Women going through postpartum are more susceptible to unexpected pregnancies. The postpartum period is one year when considering a mother's health. Intrauterine device (IUD) use at 3 and 6 months is similar to early contraceptive use. However, at 6 months, there is greater use of the implant.

=== Breastfeeding support ===
Breastfeeding support is one of the most common forms of postpartum care in both the US and Canada. Research evaluating its effectiveness has shown that peers and professional lactation consultants can be effective in promoting breastfeeding during the postpartum period. Compared with no peer support, having peer support for breastfeeding is associated with higher rates of any breastfeeding at 1 month and 3 to 6 months and of exclusive breastfeeding at 1 month. Based on a meta-analysis of randomized control trials and nonrandomized comparison studies, peer support is not related to breastfeeding outcomes past 6 months post-pregnancy. Compared with no lactation consultant, breastfeeding care provided by a lactation consultant is associated with higher rates of any breastfeeding at 6 months but not at 1 month or 3 months post pregnancy. The use of information or communication technology for the delivery of breastfeeding care is not associated with higher breastfeeding rates in the months following pregnancy.

Evidence suggests that peer support interventions are associated with increased rates of any breastfeeding at 1 to 6 months postpartum, and exclusive breastfeeding at 1 month. Similarly, lactation consultant care has been found to improve the likelihood of breastfeeding continuation up to 6 months.

=== Testing reminders ===
Provision of reminders for testing is associated with greater adherence to oral glucose tolerance testing up to 1 year postpartum but not random glucose testing or hemoglobin A1c testing.

=== Research limitations ===
Research on postpartum care is almost exclusively based on healthy postpartum individuals. Little is known about the impact of postpartum care on those individuals at high risk of postpartum complications due to chronic conditions, pregnancy-related conditions or systemic bias in health care provision. A new way for researchers to provide high-quality research in this field would be to look into the outcome of extended health insurance on postpartum health by using interventions that are aimed at healthcare providers.

== Postpartum support and mental health ==
The relationship between postpartum care models and maternal mental health has received increasing research attention. Professional support during the postpartum period, including doula care and structured home visits, has been associated with reduced rates of postpartum depression (PPD) and anxiety.

A 2022 evaluation of Medicaid doula programs across three US states found that women who received doula care had 57.5% lower odds of postpartum depression or anxiety compared to those who did not, after propensity score matching. Doula care was also associated with 52.9% lower odds of cesarean delivery. A scoping review of 16 studies similarly found that doula support was associated with reduced cesarean sections, shorter labor duration, and improved breastfeeding outcomes, particularly among low-income women.

The evidence regarding traditional postpartum confinement practices and mental health outcomes is mixed. A 2023 systematic review of 16 studies on Chinese zuo yue zi ("doing the month") practices found that four studies indicated confinement rituals reduced postpartum depression risk, two studies showed increased risk, and ten studies found no significant association, suggesting that the practice alone does not consistently protect against PPD.

Research suggests that the identity of the caregiver during the postpartum period may influence maternal outcomes. A study of 1,325 Chinese postnatal women found that 44.5% were cared for by their mother-in-law, 36.3% by their own mother, and 11.1% by a professional yuesao (confinement nanny), though the association between caregiver type and depression risk was not statistically significant after adjusting for confounding variables. A systematic review of social support and postpartum depression across Asian countries found that support from partners and close relatives was consistently a protective factor, while cultural practices had both positive effects through structured care and negative effects through strained relationships with mothers-in-law.

Dodge 2019 reported that patients who were visited by nurses and those who got regular care had comparable rates of possible depression or anxiety ( β coefficient -7.70, 95% CI -16.7 to 1.33). McCarter 2019 reported that telephone-based nursing was associated with scores on the Edinburgh Postpartum Depression Scale (EPDS) in the 10 to 12 range (RR 0.62, 95% CI 0.24 to 1.58) and with scores above 12 (RR 2.42, 95% CI 0.78 to 7.45).

== See also ==
- Parental leave
- Postpartum confinement
- Postpartum physiological changes
- Puerperal disorder
