= Puerperal (disambiguation) =

The postpartum period begins after childbirth and is typically considered to last for six weeks.

Puerperal may also refer to:

- Puerperal (childbed) fever, a fever caused by uterine infection following childbirth or miscarriage
- Puerperal disorder, a childbirth-related women's illness
- Puerperal mastitis, an infection related to having children in women
- Puerperal bipolar disorder, a postpartum anxiety maker
- Puerperal endometritis, an outer uterine inflammation
