= Sanhujori =

Korean traditional practices for postpartum care

- Hangul: 산후조리
- Hanja: 産後調理
- RR: sanhujori
- MR: sanhujori

Sanhujori (Korean: 산후조리) is the Korean culturally specific form of postpartum care. It includes consuming healthy foods, doing exercise and warming up the body. The sanhujori period typically lasts approximately from one week to one month. Sanhujori is a compound word: 'sanhu' (산후, 'after birth') and 'jori' (조리, 'recovery').

In a pre-modern society, sanhujori services were provided by the family members of mothers. However, the traditional extended family system has been broken up and the services began to be offered by private postpartum centers (sanhujoriwon 산후조리원) and postpartum care workers (sanhujorisa). People often believe that sanhujori has a great impact on women's life-long health conditions; it is believed that mothers who do not properly perform sanhujori practices may suffer from a range of illnesses, such as joint inflammation, urinary incontinence, low blood pressure, and depression.

== History ==
In Korean history, sanhujori services were usually provided by the mother's family members and in-law families. These family members performed a range of tasks, such as cooking foods for them and taking care of their newborns, thereby liberating the mothers from the heavy housework load. Through this process, mothers had an opportunity to recover their health and learn knowledge and skills, which are necessary for child caring in the future. On the other hand, some practices were superstitious rather than practical; family members sometimes blocked mothers from participating in funeral events or talking with chief mourners as it was feared that it would bring bad luck both for mothers and infants.

As the traditional extended family structure almost disappeared and a nuclear family system is prevailing in recent society, sanhujori services started to be provided by sanhujoriwons, a type of postpartum care center. This type of private centers was first introduced in 1996 in Korea.

== Concepts ==
=== Sanhujoriwon ===
A sanhujoriwon (산후조리원) is a private center which offers customized services both for mothers and their infants during the postpartum period. Until late 1998, the demand for sanhujoriwon had exceeded its supply and the simple opening of a sanhujoriwon usually guaranteed its success. As a result, poor-quality, unqualified centers had mushroomed before 2000. While many under-qualified centers have since been closed due to poor management and fire incidents, the number of sanhujoriwon has increased gradually recently. According to a national survey, it was estimated that about 50 percent of the total female population in Korea have used such a postpartum center after childbirth, in 2012. The services include skin therapy, body massages, and round-the-clock care of newborns. Some centers offer education programs of flower arrangement and laughter therapy to prevent postpartum depression.

=== Sanhujorisa ===
A sanhujorisa (산후조리사) is a type of care worker who visits a mother's house and provides visiting services for postnatal care. Sanhujorisa workers are broadly categorized into part-time workers and co-living employees. Depending on broker agencies and the demands of mothers, they perform a variety of house chores, such as laundry, room cleaning, and care of other family members, alongside the sanhujori service itself. These days, as a result of globalization and a massive inflow of immigrant workers, Joseonjok immigrants, who migrate from Northeast China, are becoming the largest portion of the sanhujorisa job market. In the public sector, the YMCA, local governments, and public health centers are providing education programs to train professional sanhujorisa for a small payment or at no charge. On the other hand, in the private sector, Korea Qualification Development Center (KQDC) is granting certificates for those who successfully complete education programs and pass a qualification examination for the position.

This job used to be known in English as a monthly nurse, but now may be called a "postnatal doula", "maternity nurse" or "newborn care specialist" – all specialized nannies.

=== Husbands and sanhujori ===
After childbirth, the husband supports the mother in the early stages of childbirth. The most necessary thing for the mother to start postpartum care is the husband's interest and care. A husband's emotional support helps meet the physical and mental needs of postpartum women in stressful situations, it lowers postpartum depression, bonds family relations, and helps the maternal role transition. Sanhujori can be a long process, and when the husband wants to be able to participate in the postpartum care, he will face many difficulties. Studies have shown that many fathers have a low knowledge of postpartum practices and care, therefore the father is often excluded from participating in postpartum care from the start. Sanhujori typically are at odds with involved husbands and rivalries can form.

== Practices ==
The main tenets of sanhujori emphasize activities and foods that keep the body warm, rest and relaxation to maximize the body's return to its normal state, maintaining cleanliness, eating nutritious foods, and peace of mind and heart. For postnatal care, the time periods of first three weeks, three months, and six months are important. The first three weeks are a period to be cautious of everything and throughout the months the body will recover and revert to its pre-pregnancy state.

=== Eating beneficial foods ===
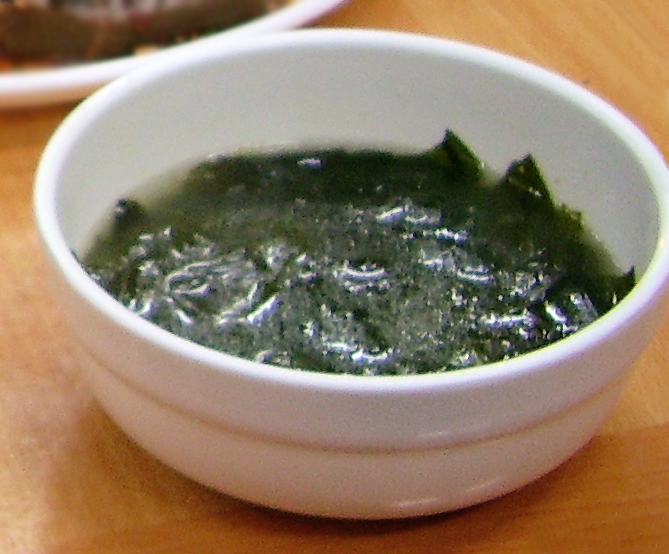
Seaweed soup in Korea

To facilitate recovery after childbirth, many Korean mothers consume the specific type of Korean traditional cuisines, which is commonly called "sanhujori foods". Common characteristics of such foods are summarized as being soft, warm, and refreshing; food with spicy flavors are perceived to be bad for the postpartum period. Among a variety of sanhujori cuisines, seaweed soup is most widely consumed by Korean mothers. Researchers demonstrated that seaweed contains a great deal of omega-3 fatty acids, i.e., polyunsaturated fatty acids found in certain seeds and fish, and the soup with seaweed helps to accelerate the recovery time of mothers.

Other than seaweed soup, Korean women also eat a variety of traditional dishes, such as a pork bone soup, ray soup, and dried cod soup (Korean: 북어국, romanized: bukeoguk). Carp and other fish are commonly eaten because of their high protein levels and ease of digestion; it aids in preventing post-natal anemia. Eating carp also promotes secretion of milk. Pumpkin expels unnecessary moisture inside the body and is good for inflammation. Corn silk tea is easy on the kidneys. Mussels help cure stomach pain caused by postpartum congested blood.

=== Keep the body warm ===
To keep their body warm, Korean mothers avoid cold temperatures and cold foods, such as ice cream and cold water. Staying indoors and refraining from outdoor activities is perceived as one of the effective ways to keep the mother's body warm. Even exposure to a cold breeze caused by the shutting of doors is a taboo in the period of the sanhujori practices. If a mother fails to keep their body warm, it is traditionally believed that she will become vulnerable to sanhubyeong, which means a life-long illness after the postpartum period. Warm postnatal sitz baths encourage rapid healing of wounds through a reduction of pain, relief of hemorrhoids from child birth, prevention of infection, and promotion of blood circulation. This refers to placing the mother's whole pelvic region, including the perineal part, in warm water of around 40 degrees Celsius while sitting.

=== Doing moderate physical exercise ===
Mothers have pain and swelling after childbirth. During the postpartum period, Korean mothers do light stretching and self-massage of the muscles to relax and strengthen their bodies. Thirty minutes for exercise, per day, is helpful in recovering the bladder and pelvic muscles rapidly.

== Postnatal sickness ==
Koreans have believed that if sanhujori practices are poorly performed or not performed at all, mothers would suffer the aftereffects of childbirth called sanhubyeong (산후병) or sanhupung (산후풍). These aftereffects where thought to last throughout the mother's entire life. Studies have shown that women who do not properly follow sanhujori practices can experience many ailments. The new mother could be subject to arthritis, neuralgia, postpartum stroke, and other disorders throughout the mother's lifespan. Postpartum strokes are the most common of postnatal symptoms. Postpartum strokes occur in the form of symptoms such as dizziness, headache, numbness in the waist area, knees, ankles, or wrists, and have cold sweats. To prevent these ailments, mothers and newborn babies must have proper care and treatment for at least three weeks to 100 days to secure lifelong health.

== See also ==
- Postpartum care
- Postpartum confinement
- Postpartum period
- Taegyo
- Kraamzorg
