= Nanny =

Person employed to take care of other people's children

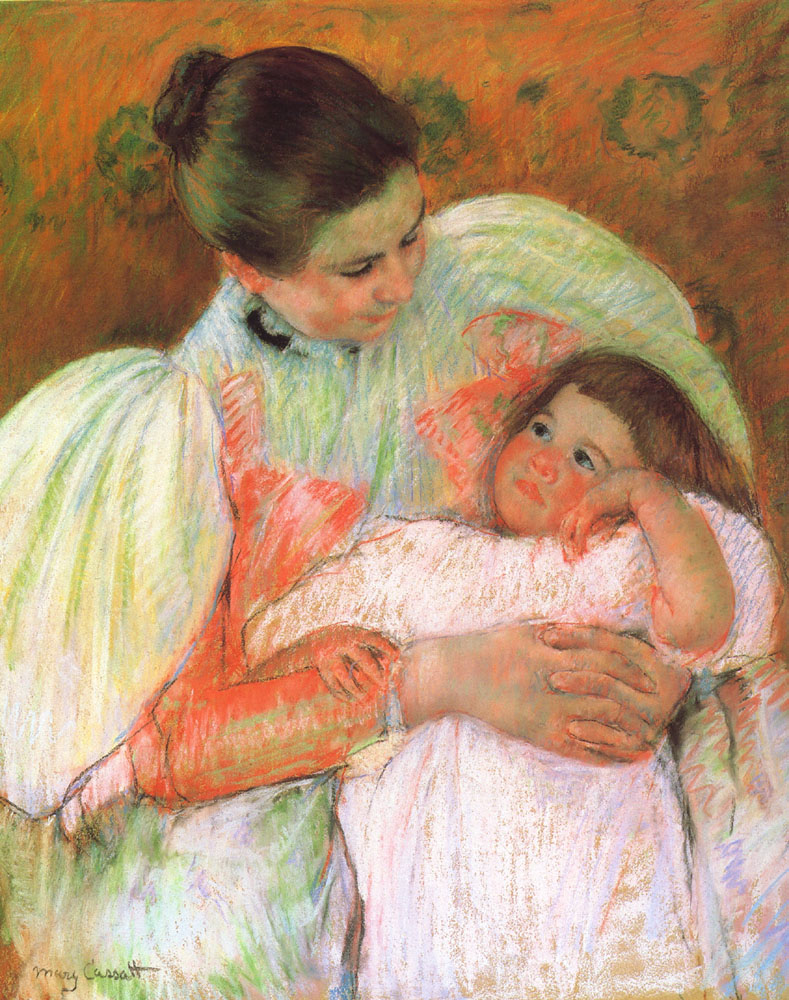
A child and her nanny

A nanny is a person who provides child care. Typically, this care is given within the children's family setting. Throughout history, nannies were usually servants in large households and reported directly to the lady of the house. Today, modern nannies, like other domestic workers, may live in or out of the house, depending on their circumstances and those of their employers. Some employment agencies specialize in providing nannies, as there are families that specifically seek them and may make them a part of the household.

Nannies differ slightly from other child care providers. A childminder works out of their own home, operating as a small business. In America, childminders are often advertised as a daycare. Depending on the country the childminder or daycare is in, government registration may or may not be required. Within the United Kingdom, a childminder must be Ofsted-registered, hold a current pediatric first aid qualification, public liability insurance and follow the Early Years Foundation Stage (EYFS). A mother's helper is someone who may live in or out of the household, and assists the person of the house with general chores as well as caring for the children. The term au pair usually refers to a young person, who comes from abroad to live with the host family and learn the local culture and language, while helping care for the children. A governess concentrates on educating children inside their own home, and a kindergarten or schoolteacher does the same, but in a school environment.

Even though there are no legal requirements to be considered a nanny, families may require a background check and a cardiopulmonary resuscitation (CPR) certification. Families may also look for other special skills in a nanny, such as being bilingual or having early childhood development coursework done. Nannies help play a key role in a child's development by providing care. The position is traditionally "women's work", but a modern male nanny may be called a manny.

== History ==
In the 19th and early 20th centuries, nannies were often employed by higher-income households. They were also known as nurses; some were wet nurses who would breastfeed the infant in place of the mother. Children often slept and played in a nursery, a suit of rooms over which a nanny had authority. In some households, nannies had assistants known as nursemaids or nurserymaids. Because of their deep involvement in raising the children of the family, nannies were often remembered with great affection and treated more kindly than other servants. Nannies were distinct from governesses, who provided education for children in a nursery.

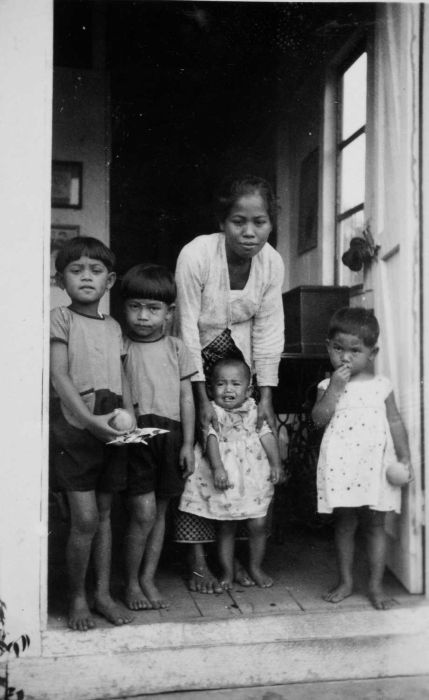
A baboe and the children in her care in the Dutch East Indies (now Indonesia), 1934

Nannies were often present in the households of the colonial officials tasked with managing vast colonial empires. Nannies in colonial societies spent their lives in the homes of their masters, often from childhood till old age, taking care of more than one generation (depending on the duration of the post). It was not uncommon for these nannies to be brought along with the family when these colonial officials were posted either back to Europe or to another colony.

- In Colonial India, a nanny was known as ayah, after aia, nurse, governess (in Portuguese). This term is presently part of the vocabulary of various languages of the Subcontinent, meaning also female servant or maid.
- In Chinese she was an amah.
- In the Dutch East Indies the household nanny was known as baboe.

== Types ==
=== Live-in nanny ===
A "live-in" nanny is much less common than it once was. Being a live-in nanny may be ideal for a person looking to move interstate or abroad for either a short period of time or to set themselves up financially. Typically, a live-in nanny is responsible for the entire care of the children of their employers. This includes anything from washing the children's clothes, tidying the children's rooms, supervising homework, preparing children's meals, taking children to and from school, and taking children to after-school sports and/or activities. Employee benefits may include a separate apartment (sometimes called a "nanny flat") or room, and possibly a car. While a live-in nanny was commonly available 24 hours a day in the past, this is much less common now and often these nannies work 10–12 hours on and the remainder of the day off. Essentially, these nannies are working while the children are awake and the parents are at work. A live-in nanny is nowadays more common among wealthier families because live-in nannies often have all their living expenses paid and provided by the employer.

=== Nanny share ===
Some families use what is known as a "nanny share", where two or more families pay for the same nanny to care for the children in each family on a part-time basis.

=== Night nanny ===
A more recent addition to the role of a nanny is that of a night nanny. The night nanny usually works with a family anywhere from one night to seven nights per week. A night nanny generally works with children from newborn to five years of age. A night nanny can provide a teaching role, helping parents to establish good sleeping patterns or troubleshooting the sleeping patterns of a child. Roles and qualifications vary between countries. The night nanny works together with the family's requirements and philosophies. The qualifications of a night nanny are usually in mothercraft nursing (see sleep guidance specialist or early childhood development). Pay rates vary from country to country, but night nannies are usually well paid in comparison to the general nanny, as the night nanny is seen as a specialist or expert in their field.

=== Maternity nurse / newborn care specialists / confinement nanny ===
Historically, European women were confined to their beds or their homes for extended periods of time after giving birth. Care was provided either by her female relatives (mother or mother-in-law) or by a temporary attendant known as a monthly nurse. These weeks were called confinement or lying-in, and ended with the re-introduction of the mother to the community in the Christian ceremony of the churching of women. A modern version of this rest period has evolved with intentions to give maximum support to the new mother, especially if she is recovering from a difficult labor and delivery.

In the US these specialty maternity nannies are known as newborn care specialists (disassociating this specialty from medically qualified nursing). They are highly experienced in all aspects of newborns, aside from medical issues. They may work 24 hours a day, seven days per week, but most commonly work five nights/days a week for the first three months of a newborn's life. The role can consist of assisting parents with feeding guidance, nursery set up, premature infant, multiples, colic, reflux, and sleep guidance/training. There are various training organizations that offer non-accredited certifications, however, in an unregulated field parents should ensure that the qualifications of their maternity nanny are legitimate and accredited. The Newborn Care Specialist Association is one of many self-appointed certification entities. Some doulas specialize in postpartum care for mother and baby. Another related job is perinatal assistant.

Chinese and related East Asian traditions practice a form of postpartum confinement known in Chinese-speaking regions as zuo yue zi "sitting the month", which are traditions and customs regarding recovery from childbirth. The "confinement ladies" are referred to as yue sao, and they have specialized knowledge of how to care for both baby and mother. In Singapore and Malaysia, newborn care specialists are better known as confinement nannies. They assist the mother in taking care of the baby in order to let the mother have a good rest. Confinement food will be prepared to help with the recovery. Usually, the employment period will be about 28 days up to a maximum of 16 weeks. In Korea these postpartum care workers are called Sanhujorisa.

In the Netherlands, standard postnatal care, supported by state medical insurance, includes more than a week of all-day visits called kraamzorg. This kraamverzorgster ("maternity home care assistant") teaches the new mother how to care for her baby, measures both of their health, prepares light meals, entertains older children, performs light household tasks, cleans the home and disinfects the bathroom. They help care for the mother, baby, and family.

== Demographic ==
Typically, women from their 20s to 60s take up employment as nannies. Some are younger, though normally younger workers are nursemaids or au pairs rather than nannies in the traditional use of the term.

A few positions are filled by men; the term manny is sometimes used for a male nanny, especially in the US and UK.

== Qualifications ==
In the United States, and in the United Kingdom, no formal qualifications are required to be a nanny. However, some parents prefer or sometimes require their nanny to have a CPR and/or first aid certification. In the United States, nanny training and certifications are increasing as the US Nanny Association has published national standards and issues certifications for Professional Nannies, Newborn and Infant Professionals and Certified Nannies. Many nannies have childhood education credits or degrees, though these are usually not required.

== Notable nannies ==
=== British royal family ===
- Charlotte Bill (1875–1965), known as Lalla, nanny of Prince John of the United Kingdom, featured in the film The Lost Prince
- Clara Knight, known as "Alla", nanny of Queen Elizabeth II and Princess Margaret
- Tiggy Legge-Bourke MVO (born 1965), nanny to Prince William and Prince Harry
- Lillian Sperling, head nanny of the show Nanny 911

=== Other royal families ===
- Margaretta Eagar (1863–1936), nanny to the four daughters of Tsar Nicholas II
- Louise von Sturmfeder (1789–1866), lady-in-waiting to the House of Habsburg and aja (then rendered "nurse", now nanny) to Franz Joseph I of Austria and his brother Maximilian I of Mexico

=== Other ===
- St. Josephine Bakhita (1869–1947), an enslaved African who worked as a nanny and later became a Roman Catholic saint in Italy
- Deborah Carroll and Stella Reid, highly experienced nannies from the show Nanny 911
- Veronica Crook, who has accompanied Jacob Rees-Mogg since childhood
- Elizabeth Ann Everest (1832–1895), beloved nanny to the young Winston Churchill
- Jo Frost, nanny who hosted a successful television program Supernanny in the UK and US, showing parents techniques to help with unruly children
- Loh Chiu, amah to Arthur, the son of General Douglas MacArthur, who escaped from the Philippines with his parents in the face of the advancing Imperial Japanese Army and cared for the sickly four-year-old during their nine-day ordeal, including four days fleeing in a torpedo boat and B-17 bomber
- Yoselyn Ortega, nanny who murdered children Lucia and Leo Krim in 2012 by stabbing them to death
- Sandra Samuel (b. 1964), an Indian nanny who saved the life of a child during the 2008 Mumbai attacks in which the baby's two parents were murdered; later honored with honorary Israeli citizenship.

== Nannies in popular culture ==
Various television programs feature real nannies, many of whom help parents discipline children. These include Abismo de pasión, Nanny 911, Supernanny, and Take Home Nanny.

In addition, several television series feature fictional nannies including the comedy The Nanny as well as the popular Disney series Jessie.
