= Churching of women =

Christian blessing for mothers after birth

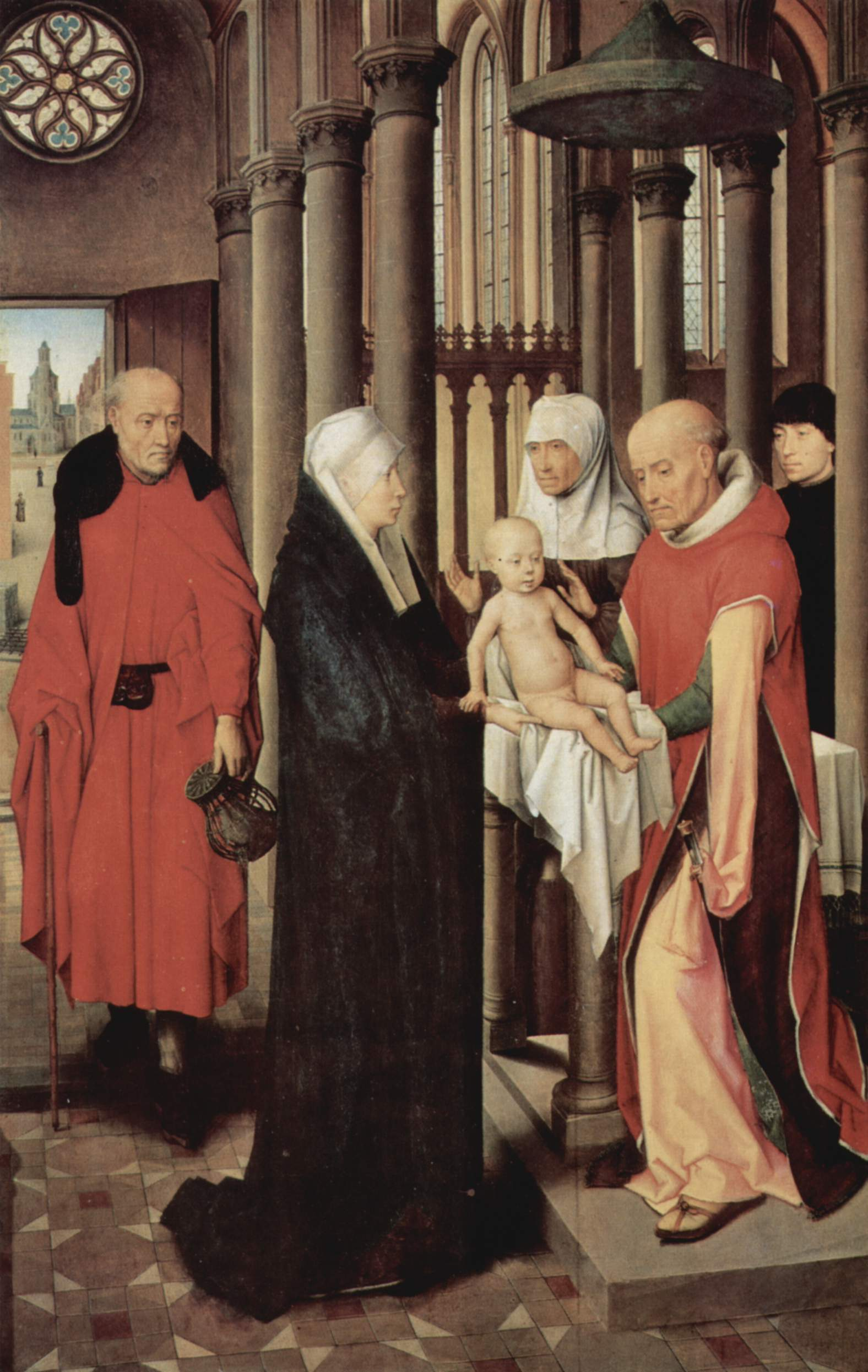
Presentation in the Temple, a representation of the presentation of Jesus at the Temple upon which the churching of women is based (Hans Memling, c. 1470, Museo del Prado. Madrid)

In Christian tradition the churching of women, also known as thanksgiving for the birth or adoption of a child, is the ceremony wherein a blessing is given to mothers after recovery from childbirth. The ceremony includes thanksgiving for the woman's survival of childbirth, and is performed even when the child is stillborn or has died unbaptized.

Although the ceremony itself contains no elements of ritual purification, it was related to Jewish practice as noted in Leviticus 12:2–8, where women were purified after giving birth. In light of the New Testament, the Christian ritual draws on the imagery and symbolism of the presentation of Jesus at the Temple (Luke 2:22–40). Although some Christian traditions consider Mary to have borne Christ without incurring impurity, she went to the Temple in Jerusalem to fulfil the requirements of the Law of Moses.

The rite is first mentioned in pseudo-Nicene Arabic canon law. The Christian rite for the churching of women continues in Eastern Christianity, the Lutheran churches, the Anglican Communion and the Methodist churches; but in the Roman Rite it is found only in the pre-Vatican II form and in Anglican Ordinariate parishes.

== History ==
The custom of blessing a woman after childbirth recalls the Purification of the Blessed Virgin Mary mentioned in Luke 2:22. The Jewish practice was based on Leviticus 12:1–8, which specified the ceremonial rite to be performed in order to restore ritual purity. It was believed that a woman becomes ritually unclean by giving birth owing to the presence of blood and/or other fluids at birth. This was part of ceremonial rather than moral law.

Natalie Knödel noted that the idea that a woman who has recently given birth is to be set apart and then reintroduced into religious and social life by means of a special rite is not a specifically Western, let alone Christian, idea. Such rites are found in a number of cultures. All things having to do with birth and death are understood as somehow sacred. Paul V. Marshall suggests that in an agricultural society this could have been a simple means of protecting a new mother from resuming work too soon after giving birth. Enforced rest after childbirth is known as postpartum confinement. Historically, European women were confined to their beds or their homes for extensive periods after giving birth in a custom called lying-in; care was provided either by her female relatives (mother or mother-in-law) or by a temporary attendant known as a monthly nurse. "Churching" served to mark the end of these weeks of separation and reintegrate the new mother into her community.

The rite became the subject of a good deal of misunderstanding, since many commentators and preachers, in describing its scriptural antecedents, did not explain the concept clearly. Pope Gregory I as early as the 6th century protested against any notion that defilement was incurred by childbirth and recommended that women should never be separated from the church in case it was seen as such. As a blessing given to mothers after recovery from childbirth, "it is not a precept, but a pious and praiseworthy custom, dating from the early Christian ages." David Cressy points out that the ceremony acknowledged the woman's labours and the perils of childbirth. At the conclusion of a month after childbirth, women looked forward to churching as a social occasion, and a time to celebrate with friends. For men it marked the end of a month during which they had to take care of the domestic affairs, commonly referred to as the "gander month". In thirteenth-century France the rite focused on the woman's role as wife and mother.

The Second Plenary Council of Baltimore, an American Roman-Catholic gathering held in October 1866, noted that churching after childbirth had been generally neglected in the United States and was to be insisted upon, and prohibited the practice of churching in places in which Mass is not celebrated.

== In the West ==
=== Roman Catholicism ===
The custom, referred to in many places as the "Churching of Women", was retained in the Church until very recent times, and still is in the old rite. The official title of the Rite was actually Benedictio mulieris post partum (the blessing of a woman after giving birth), and focused on blessing and thanksgiving. The rite largely fell into disuse in the late 1960s following the Second Vatican Council, but a number of traditional Catholic women still undergo the rite. The Book of Blessings published in 1984 contains a "Blessing of a Woman after Childbirth" that is significantly altered from the old rite used before the Council, but fulfills the same liturgical purpose. The current baptismal rite (which also incorporates a blessing of the father) contains a blessing for the mother, but the older rite is a special blessing.

The concluding prayer reads:

Almighty, everlasting God, through the delivery of the blessed Virgin Mary, Thou hast turned into joy the pains of the faithful in childbirth; look mercifully upon this Thy handmaid, coming in gladness to Thy temple to offer up her thanks: and grant that after this life, by the merits and intercession of the same blessed Mary, she may merit to arrive, together with her offspring, at the joys of everlasting happiness. Through Christ our Lord.

The "Order for the Blessing of a Mother after Childbirth" is still used, primarily for those mothers who were unable to attend the baptism, and is not necessarily held in a church. It may be imparted by a priest, deacon or authorized lay minister.

=== Lutheranism ===
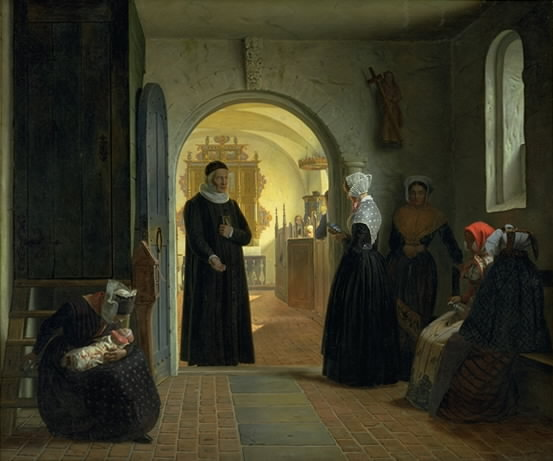
A Woman's Solemn Churching after Childbirth (Christen Dalsgaard, 1860). Depicted is a Church of Denmark (Lutheran) ceremony.

The churching of women was historically offered to women in the Lutheran Church, taking place after the celebration of Holy Communion in the liturgy.

A prayer "For the Churching of Women" as it appeared in the 1918 liturgy of The Lutheran Church—Missouri Synod, reads as follows:

God, we praise Thee for Thy great mercy shown to this mother and her child, and humbly beseech Thee to keep them always in Thy gracious care. Hear, O Lord, the supplications of the mother, take her into Thy fatherly protection, and compass her with Thy favor as with a shield. Dispose and enable the parents to give their child a Christian training, that so it may grow up to Thine honor and the joy of all true believers. Amen.

— Concordia Publishing House, Liturgy and Agenda. Abridged Edition. (1918), Part I. Liturgy. Special Intercessions and Thanksgivings: — 2. For the Churching of Women (p.48)

=== Anglicanism ===
The rite of the "Churching of Women" is offered in the Anglican Communion with a liturgy as part of the Book of Common Prayer.

In the US-based Episcopal Church, the "Churching of Women" is a liturgy for the purification or "churching" of women after childbirth, together with the presentation in church of the child. The 1979 Book of Common Prayer, avoiding any hint of ritual impurity, replaces the older rite with "A Thanksgiving for the Birth or Adoption of a Child." The rite is to take place within the Sunday liturgy, after the intercessions, soon after the birth or adoption. In this service, parents and other family members come to the church with the newly born or adopted child "to be welcomed by the congregation and to give thanks to Almighty God" (Book of Common Prayer, p. 439).

=== Methodism ===
The rite of the churching of women, officially known as the "An Order of Thanksgiving for the Birth or Adoption of a Child", continues to be offered in Methodist churches. The rubrics concerning the rite state:

Following the birth or adoption of a child, the parent(s), together with other members of the family, may present the child in a service of worship to be welcomed by the congregation and to give thanks to God. Part or all of this order may be included in any service of congregational worship. Thanksgiving for the birth or adoption of a child may also be offered to God in a hospital or home, using such parts of this order as are appropriate. It should be made clear to participants that this act is neither an equivalent of nor a substitute for Holy Baptism but has an entirely different history and meaning. This act is appropriate (1) prior to the presentation of the child for baptism, or (2) if the child has been baptized elsewhere and is being presented for the first time in the congregation where his or her nurture is to take place.

=== Customs ===
Custom differs, but the usual date of churching was the fortieth day after confinement (or giving birth), in accordance with the Biblical date and Jewish practice. The Purification of Mary and the presentation of Jesus at the Temple are commemorated forty days after Christmas.

The service included in the English Book of Common Prayer dates only from the Middle Ages. While the churching was normally performed by a priest in the parish church there were exceptions of women being churched at home.

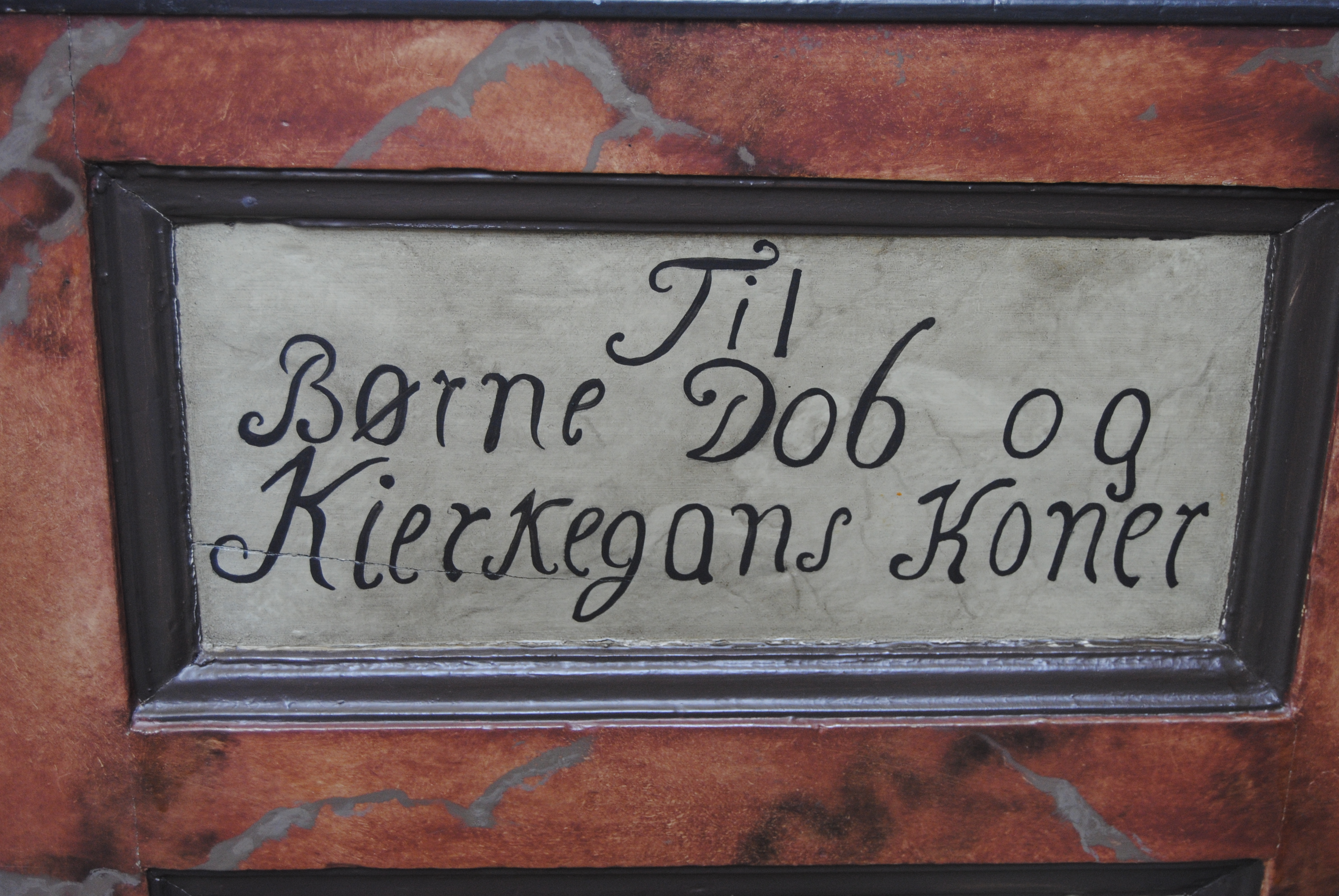
"For baptism of children and churching of women" inscribed on a church bench in Mariager, Denmark

Prior to the English Reformation, according to the rubric the woman was to occupy the "convenient place" near the narthex. In the first prayer book of King Edward VI, she was to be "nigh unto the quire door". In the second of his books, she was to be "nigh unto the place where the Table (or altar) standeth". Bishop Matthew Wren orders for the diocese of Norwich in 1636 were that women to be churched would come and kneel at a side near the communion table outside the rail, being veiled according to custom, and not covered with a hat. In some parishes there was a special pew known as the "churching seat". Conducting the ritual inside the church rather than on the porch is an outward sign that ritual impurity of a childbearing woman was no longer presumed.

Churchings were formerly registered in some parishes. In Herefordshire it was not considered proper for the husband to appear in church at the service, or to sit with his wife in the same pew. The words in the rubric requiring the woman to come "decently apparelled", refer to the times when it was thought unbecoming for a woman to come to the service with the elaborate head-dress then the fashion. A veil was usually worn. In some parishes a special veil was provided by the church, for an inventory of goods belonging to St Benet Gracechurch in 1560 includes "a churching cloth, fringed, white damask."

In pre-Reformation days, it was the custom in Catholic England for women to carry lighted tapers when being churched, an allusion to the Feast of the Purification of the Virgin (February 2), and also celebrated as Candlemas, the day chosen by the Catholic Church for the blessing of the candles for the whole year. At her churching, a woman was expected to make some votive offering to the church, such as the chrisom or alb placed on the child at its christening.

Augustine Schulte described the ceremony in the early twentieth century: The mother, kneels in the vestibule, or within the church, carrying a lighted candle. The priest, vested in surplice and white stole, sprinkles her with holy water in the form of a cross. Having recited Psalm 24, "The earth is the Lord's and the fullness thereof", he offers her the left extremity of the stole and leads her into the church, saying: "Enter thou into the temple of God, adore the Son of the Blessed Virgin Mary who has given thee fruitfulness of offspring." She advances to one of the altars and kneels before it, whilst the priest, turned towards her, recites the appropriate blessing, and then, having sprinkled her again with holy water in the form of the cross, dismisses her, saying: "The peace and blessing of God Almighty, the Father, the Son, and the Holy Ghost, descend upon thee, and remain forever. Amen." According to commentary provided in a modern Catholic tutorial on the mass, the fact that the priest goes to meet the mother and escort her into the church is in itself a mark of respect for her.

It was formerly regarded as unwise for a woman to leave her house to go out at all after confinement until she went to be churched. In Anglo-Irish folk tradition, new mothers who had yet to be churched were regarded as attractive to the fairies, and so in danger of being kidnapped by them. However, the origin of the church ritual is unrelated to these later local superstitions, which accrued to it.

== In the East ==
In the Eastern Orthodox and Eastern Catholic Churches of the Byzantine Rite, many jurisdictions still observe the tradition of the woman coming to church on the 40th day after childbirth for special blessings. For forty days a new mother remains at home to recuperate and to care for her child. However, if the child has not survived, the woman still remains at home to heal physically and emotionally. During the time of her confinement, the woman does not normally receive the eucharist, unless she is in danger of death. As the service is practiced in the Byzantine Rite, it involves both the blessing of the mother and the presentation of the child to God. The churching should be distinguished from two other brief rites that take place at childbirth: the Prayers on the First Day After Childbirth, and the Naming of the Child on the Eighth Day. These usually take place in the home. In some traditions, it is customary to baptize the child on the eighth day, following the example of the Old Testament rite of bris or circumcision of boys. In that case, the naming of the child would take place in the temple (church building); however, the mother would not attend, the child being presented by its godparents.

=== Churching of the Woman ===
On the fortieth day after childbirth, the mother is brought to the temple to be churched; that is to say, to receive a blessing as she begins attending church and receiving the sacraments once again. The child (if it has survived) is brought by the mother, who has already been cleansed and washed, accompanied by the intended sponsors (Godparents) who will stand at the child's baptism. They all stand together in the narthex before the doors of the nave, facing east. The priest blesses them and says prayers for the woman and the child, giving thanks for their wellbeing and asking God's grace and blessings upon them.

=== Churching of the Child ===
Then, if the infant has already been baptized, he performs the churching of the child; if not, he does the churching immediately after the baptism.

Taking up the child, the priest lifts it up, making the sign of the cross with the child before the doors of the temple, saying: "The servant of God (Name) is churched, in the Name of the Father, and of the Son, and of the Holy Spirit. Amen."

He then carries the child into the center of the nave, as he says, "I will go into Thy House. I will worship toward Thy Holy Temple in fear of Thee." Stopping in the center, he says, "The servant of God (Name) is churched, in the Name of the Father, and of the Son, and of the Holy Spirit. Amen. In the midst of the congregation I will sing praises unto Thee."

He then walks up to the iconostasis, and stopping in front of the royal doors, he says, "The servant of God (Name) is churched, in the Name of the Father, and of the Son, and of the Holy Spirit. Amen."

He then carries the baby into the sanctuary and around the back of the altar and out again onto the soleas.

He then chants the Nunc dimittis and says a special apolysis (dismissal), after which he blesses the child with the Sign of the Cross on its forehead, mouth and heart, and returns it to its mother.

== See also ==
- Ablution in Christianity
- Hygiene in Christianity

== Sources ==
- A History of Women's Bodies, Edward Shorter, Penguin, New York, 1982
