= Take Home Nanny =

- Starring: Emma Jenner
- Country of origin: United States
- No. of seasons: 1
- No. of episodes: 10

Production
- Executive producer: Gerry McKean
- Running time: 60 minutes (including commercials)

Original release
- Network: The Learning Channel
- Release: July 14 – September 20, 2008

Take Home Nanny is an hour-long reality show. It originally aired on TLC.

The show features professional nanny Emma Jenner whose basic approach instills manners, encourages boundaries and discipline.

== Format ==
In each episode, Jenner visits the home of families across America helping them instill some order within their households.

Jenner introduces herself to a family at their home. The family identify a forthcoming event in which Jenner needs to get the children ready for. She spends a day observing both the parents and children to identify their problems. Jenner works closely with the family, giving them the advice and tools necessary to fix undesirable behavior, bringing harmony into the home. Jenner's work is put to the test at the big family event.

== Episode Guide ==
No. overall	No. in season	Title	Original release date
1	1	"The Tanjutco Family"	July 14, 2008
With their family reunion around the corner, Alex and Meg Tanjutco are overwhelmed by their chaotic triplets.
2	2	"The Berks Family"	July 21, 2008
Emma assists a mom with two needy computer addicted daughters and a busy husband.
3	3	"The McCarthy Family"	July 28, 2008
A couple have four days to get their four little girls under control for a family ferry ride.
4	4	"The Gil Family"	August 11, 2008
With their grandmother's birthday approaching, Emma helps a family with disobedient children who exhibit violence and show no respect to their family.
5	5	"The Virgas Family"	August 16, 2008
Emma attempts to discipline two unruly boys before they are banned from a school field trip.
6	6	"The DiSomma-Faretras Family"	August 18, 2008
A father needs help getting control of his three clingy little girls so the overburdened mother can get a break.
7	7	"The Monteliones Family"	August 18, 2008
Emma helps parents get their kids calmed down before the family poses for a group portrait.
8	8	"The Tsouos Family"	September 8, 2008
Parents of aggressive twins need help from Emma to get the kids to behave well for a dinner with a teacher at the new school they want the boys to attend next year.
9	9	"The Bell Family"	September 8, 2008
Emma helps parents control their three stubborn children before the family hosts a neighborhood block party.
10	10	"The Hanneman-Scots Family"	September 20, 2008
A single mom needs help with her two rambunctious sons.

== See also ==
- Supernanny, a similar British and American series.
