= Postpartum disorder =

- Specialty: Obstetrics

A postpartum disorder or puerperal disorder is a disease or condition which presents primarily during the days and weeks after childbirth called the postpartum period. The postpartum period can be divided into three distinct stages: the initial or acute phase, 6–12 hours after childbirth; subacute postpartum period, which lasts two to six weeks, and the delayed postpartum period, which can last up to six months. In the subacute postpartum period, 87% to 94% of women report at least one health problem. Long term health problems (persisting after the delayed postpartum period) are reported by 31% of women.

The World Health Organization (WHO) describes the postpartum period as the most critical and yet the most neglected phase in the lives of mothers and babies; most maternal and newborn deaths occur during the postpartum period.

== Physical disorders ==
=== Diastasis recti ===
Diastasis recti is a gap between the two sides of the rectus abdominis muscle that can occur in the antenatal and postnatal periods. This condition has no associated morbidity or mortality. Treatment is physiotherapy.

=== Haemorrhage ===
Primary postpartum haemorrhage is blood loss following childbirth of more than 500ml (minor) or 1000ml (major). Secondary postpartum haemorrhage is abnormal or excessive bleeding after 24 hours and before 12 weeks postnatally.

=== Incontinence ===
Urinary incontinence and fecal incontinence have been linked to all methods of childbirth, with the incidence of urinary incontinence at six months postpartum being 3–7% and fecal incontinence 1–3%.

=== Infection ===
Postpartum infections, also known as childbed fever and puerperal fever, are any bacterial infections of the female reproductive tract following childbirth or miscarriage. Signs and symptoms usually include a fever greater than 38.0 °C (100.4 °F), chills, lower abdominal pain, and possibly bad-smelling vaginal discharge. It usually occurs after the first 24 hours and within the first ten days following delivery.

=== Mastitis ===
Puerperal mastitis is inflammation of the breast usually associated with breastfeeding. Symptoms typically include local pain and redness. There is often an associated fever and general soreness. Onset is typically fairly rapid and usually occurs within the first few months of delivery. Complications can include abscess formation.

=== Obstetric fistula ===
Obstetric fistula is a medical condition in which a hole develops in the birth canal as a result of childbirth, typically after a prolonged obstructed labour and is preventable with timely access to Cesarean section. The fistula can occur between the vagina and rectum, ureter, or bladder. It can result in incontinence of urine or feces.

=== Perineal tearing ===
Perineal tearing is the spontaneous (unintended) tearing of the skin and other soft tissue structures which, in women, separate the vagina from the anus. Perineal tearing occurs in 85% of vaginal deliveries. At six months postpartum, 21% of women still report perineal pain and 11–49% report sexual problems or painful intercourse.

=== Peripartum cardiomyopathy ===
Peripartum cardiomyopathy is decrease in heart function which occurs in the last month of pregnancy, or up to six months post-pregnancy. It increases the risk of congestive heart failure, heart arrhythmias, thromboembolism, and cardiac arrest.

=== Postpartum thyroiditis ===
Postpartum thyroiditis is a phenomenon observed following pregnancy and may involve hyperthyroidism, hypothyroidism or the two sequentially. It affects about 5% of all women within a year after giving birth.

=== Pelvic organ prolapse ===
Pelvic organ prolapse occurs when the uterus, bladder or rectum drop lower in the pelvis creating a bulge in the vagina. Approximately half of all women who have given birth experience some degree of pelvic organ prolapse, most frequently as they age and go through menopause.

== Psychological disorders ==
=== Postpartum depression ===
Postpartum depression is a moderate to severe depressive episode starting anytime during pregnancy or within the four weeks following delivery. It occurs in 4–20% of pregnancies, depending on its definition. Without treatment, postpartum depression can last for months or years. In addition to affecting the mother's health, it can interfere with her ability to connect with and care for her baby and may cause the baby to have problems with sleeping, eating, and behavior as he or she grows. In 38% of the cases of postpartum depression, women are still depressed three years postpartum. In 0.2% of pregnancies, postpartum depression leads to psychosis. Research indicates that the location and method of postpartum care delivery may not significantly impact depression or anxiety symptoms. Whether care is provided at home, by telephone, or in a clinical setting, the outcomes for maternal mental health are similar. Additionally, integrated care models involving multiple providers have not shown to reduce postpartum depression rates in the first year after birth.

=== Postpartum psychosis ===
Postpartum psychosis is one of the many conditions that may occur following pregnancy or within the six week postpartum period. It is listed under mental and behavioral disorders associated with pregnancy, childbirth or the puerperium with psychotic symptoms, and involves significant mental and behavioural features, including psychotic symptoms such as delusions and hallucinations. Mood symptoms associated with depression or mania are also typically present.

=== Posttraumatic stress disorder (PTSD) ===
Research shows that symptoms of Posttraumatic stress disorder are common following childbirth, with prevalence of 24–30.1% at six weeks, dropping to 13.6% at six months. PTSD is rarer; a review found that following normal childbirth (excluding stillbirth and some other complications) rates of PTSD ranged from 2.8–5.6% after six weeks, dropping to 1.5% at six months.

== See also ==
- Postpartum physiological changes
- Postpartum care
- Postpartum confinement, a period of rest
