= Lying-in =

Old childbirth practice

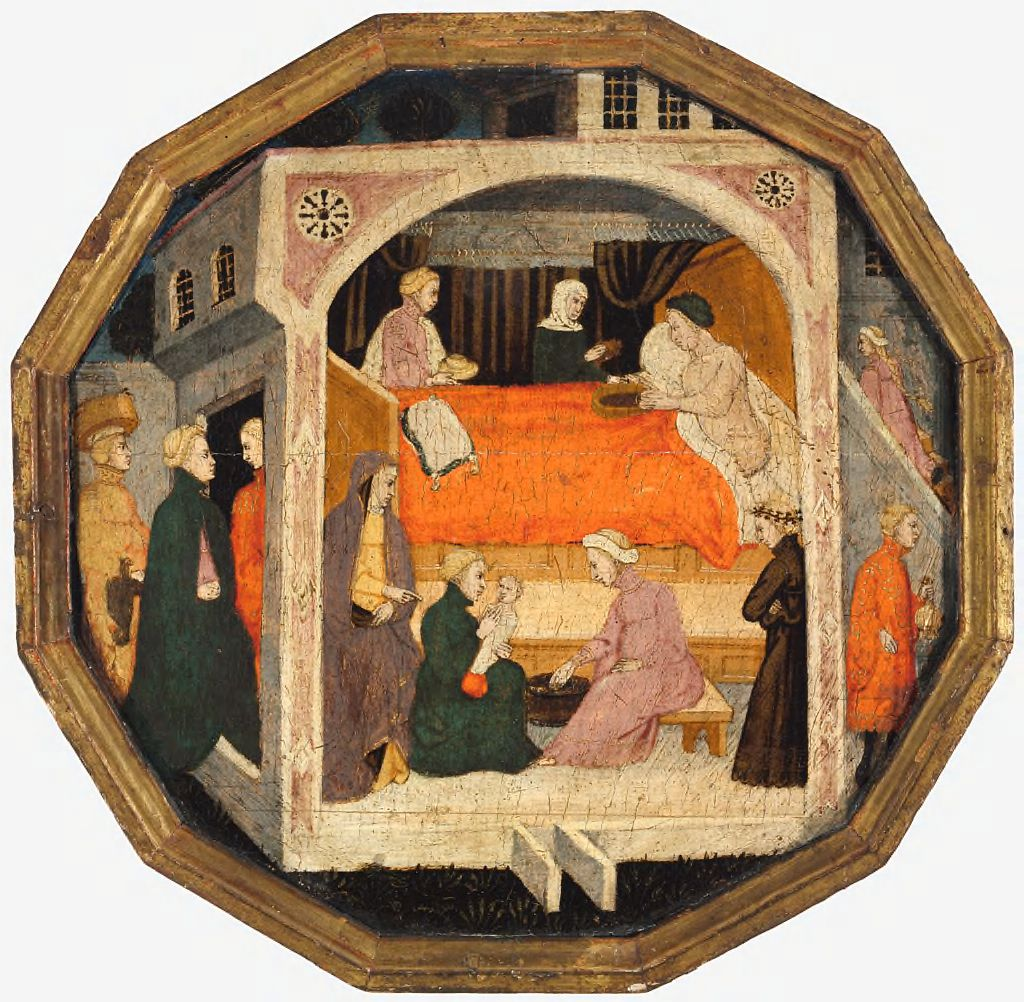
A mother in Florence lying-in, from a painted desco da parto or birth tray of c. 1410. As women tend to the child, expensively-dressed female guests are already arriving.

Lying-in is the term given to the European forms of postpartum confinement, the traditional practice involving long bed rest before and after giving birth. The term and the practice it describes in the Western world have, with the rise of productivism, come to be seen as old-fashioned or archaic, but lying-in remains an essential component of the postpartum period elsewhere, even if there were no medical complications during childbirth.

== Description ==
A 1932 publication refers to lying-in as ranging from two weeks to two months. It also suggests not "getting up" (getting out of bed post-birth) for at least nine days and ideally for 20 days. Care was provided either by her female relatives (mother or mother-in-law), or, for those who could afford it, by a temporary worker called the monthly nurse. These weeks ended with the re-introduction of the mother to the community in the Christian ceremony of the churching of women. When lying-in was a more common term, it was used in the names of several maternity hospitals, for example the General Lying-In Hospital in London. Until the 1970s, standard NHS postpartum care involved 10 days in hospital, with the newborns taken to the nursery overnight, ensuring the mothers were well rested by the time they returned home.

== Special foods ==
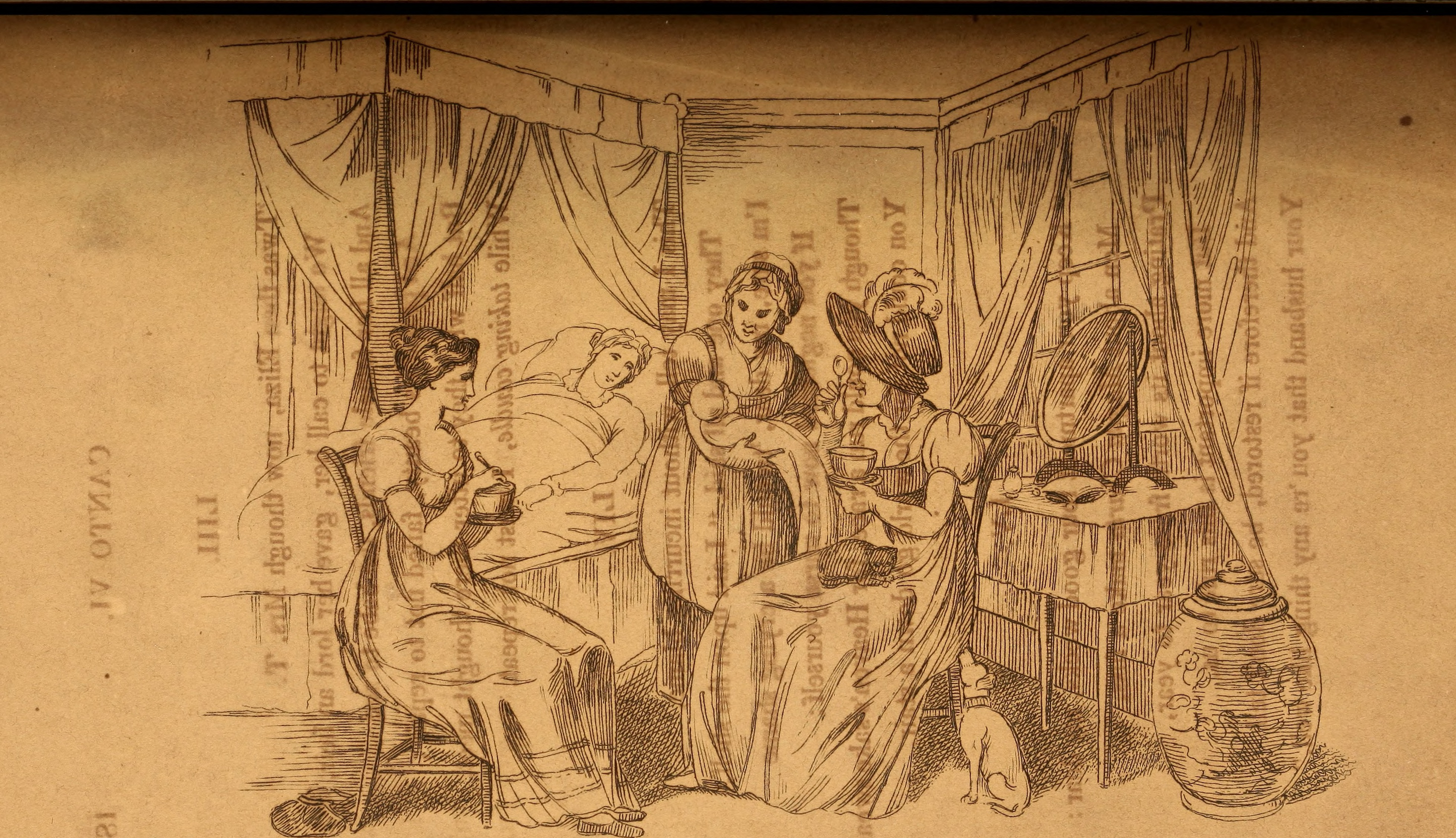
Richard Dagley's illustration "Taking caudle" of Thomas Gaspey's poem. The new mother reclines in a four-poster bed, recouping her energy. A member of the household sits at the foot of the bed, entertaining a visitor, who keeps her bonnet on; both of them are drinking caudle. A maidservant shows the baby to the visitor, while a dog and cat look on.

A caudle was a hot drink, well documented in British cuisine, particularly in Victorian times, as suitable for invalids and new mothers. So much was it associated with the visits of friends to see the new baby that "cake and caudle" or "taking caudle" became a metonym for postpartum social visits.

== Social aspects ==
Women received congratulatory visits from friends and family during the period; among many traditional customs around the world, the desco da parto was a special form of painted tray presented to the mother in Renaissance Florence. The many scenes painted on these trays show female visitors bringing presents, received by the mother in bed, while other women tend to the baby. Equivalent gifts in contemporary culture include baby showers and push presents.

No fixed term of lying-in is recommended in Renaissance manuals on family life (unlike in some other cultures), but documentary records suggest that the mother was rarely present at the baptism, which in Italian cities was usually held within a week of the birth at the local parish church, normally a few minutes' walk from any house.

== In art ==
In art, the immensely popular scene of the Birth of Jesus technically shows the Virgin Mary, who reclines on a couch in most medieval examples, lying-in, but in famously non-ideal conditions. More ideal images of lying-in in well-off households are represented in Birth of the Virgin and Birth of John the Baptist. These are generally given contemporary settings, and differ little from other images that are purely secular, especially those on desci da parto.
