= Kraamzorg =

Dutch and Belgian postnatal care service

Kraamzorg is a service in the Netherlands and Belgium where postnatal care is provided to a new mother and her baby in the initial eight to 10 days immediately after birth.

This support comes in the form of a qualified maternity nurse or health care professional, kraamverzorgster, who comes to the home in order to provide care and instruction for the newborn. Kraamzorg care is included in standard health insurance packages in the Netherlands; though, depending on specific policy, a small contribution for each hour of care is expected.

== Responsibilities ==
The primary responsibility of the kraamverzorgster is to ensure that the mother's recovery is quick and efficient, and that the baby develops appropriately. Tasks usually adopted by the kraamverzorgster include, but are not limited to: flagging any issues that may arise between the new mother and midwife or doctor, ensuring the area in which the mother and the baby are in is clean and hygienic, ensuring that the mother is healing well after the birth, supporting the mother with feeding issues (whether this be breast or bottle feeding). It typically lasts eight days after coming home from hospital, or twice that for special cases such as multiple births. Historically, professional monthly nurses served a similar function in the UK.

Interaction with the kraamzorg organisation of choice begins in the thirty-fourth week of pregnancy. At this point, a chosen representative will visit the home and discuss what type of support is available, depending on whether the mother is planning a home or hospital birth. The hours of care each mother is entitled to vary, and can even change after birth. There are three levels of care: basic, minimal, and flexible, that translate into a specific number of daily hours of service depending on the mother and the family's personal situation. Factors that can affect which level of care a mother is entitled to include: number of children already in the family, an unstable home situation, problems with breastfeeding, and illness in the family. The kraamzorg organisation provides a list of items that should be in the home in order to prepare for the arrival of the child, and the company issues a file where mothers can track the day-to-day progress of their babies, as well as their own recovery. Families and mothers are encouraged to ask as many questions as possible in preparation for their first meeting with a representative from the kraamzorg organisation.

A similar service, Kraamzorg UK, was launched in Manchester in 2013.

== See also ==
- Postpartum confinement, a period of rest after childbirth
- Sanhujori
