= Postpartum physiological changes =

Changes that can occur to the woman's body after childbirth

The postpartum physiological changes are those expected changes that occur in the woman's body after childbirth, in the postpartum period. These changes mark the beginning of the return of pre-pregnancy physiology and of breastfeeding. Most of the time these postnatal changes are normal and can be managed with medication and comfort measures, but in a few situations complications may develop. Postpartum physiological changes may be different for women delivering by cesarean section. Other postpartum changes, may indicate developing complications such as, postpartum bleeding, engorged breasts, postpartum infections.

== Breasts and lactation ==
The breasts change during pregnancy to prepare for lactation, and more changes occur immediately after the birth. Progesterone is the hormone that influences the growth of breast tissue before the birth. Afterwards, the endocrine system shifts from producing hormones that prevent lactation to ones that trigger milk production. The first secretions are known as colostrum and are rich in substances that help the newborn adjust to life outside the womb. About two to five days after the birth the breasts begin to produce milk. This sometimes is described as "the milk coming in".

Information can be provided to the mother before the birth to enhance the understanding of breastfeeding and the support that will be available to make it successful. The mother is encouraged to breastfeed and spend time bonding with her infant immediately after the birth.

Sucking causes the pituitary gland to release oxytocin, which contracts the uterus and prevents bleeding. This can be felt by the mother in the breasts. The crying of the infant can also induce the release of oxytocin. Cracked nipples can develop at this time, which can be managed with pharmacological and nonpharmacological treatment.

== Uterus ==
The most drastic change in the uterus is the contraction from an organ weighing one kilogram and a volume of about 10 litres down to a 60 gram organ that only contains 5 ml of fluid. Immediately after delivery, the fundus of the uterus begins to contract. This is to deliver the placenta which can take up to 30 minutes and may involve a feeling of chills. In a normal and healthy response it should feel firm and not boggy. It begins to involute with contractions of the smooth muscle of the uterus. It will contract midline with the umbilicus. It begins its contractions and by twelve hours after the birth it can be felt to be at the level of the umbilicus. The uterus changes in size from one kilogram to 60-80 grams in the space of six weeks. After birth, the fundus contracts downward into the pelvis one centimeter each day. After two weeks the uterus will have contracted and return into the pelvis. The sensation and strength of postpartum uterine contractions can be stronger in women who have previously delivered a child or children.

== Cervix, vagina and perineum ==
The cervix remains soft after birth. The vagina contracts and begins to return to the size before pregnancy. For four to six weeks of the postpartum period the vagina will discharge lochia, a discharge containing blood, mucus, and uterine tissue.

== Immunity ==
During pregnancy the normal inflammatory immune response is shut down in order to allow the acceptance of the embryo to the body. In the postpartum period this needs to be quickly reversed back to normal. This immune reconstitution can result in the symptomatic expression of infections that were present but previously not responded to, especially infections with an autoimmune basis.

== Pain control and comfort measures ==
Education and discussion before the birth can alleviate some of the fear of the unknown and the anxiety when treatments are experienced for the first time. Providing continuous updates on the status of the infant is beneficial.

Perineal pain after childbirth has immediate and long-term negative effects for women and their babies. These effects can interfere with breastfeeding and the care of the infant. The pain from injection sites and possible episiotomy is managed by the frequent assessment of the report of pain from the mother. Pain can come from possible lacerations, incisions, uterine contractions and sore nipples. Appropriate medications are usually administered. Routine episiotomies have not been found to reduce the level of pain after the birth. Comfort is enhanced with changing linens, urination, the cleaning of the perineum and ice packs. Privacy also in implemented to promote comfort.

Hemorrhoid pain can be managed with a variety of methods. Some recommendations for reducing the pain of hemorrhoids include: cleansing with warm water, hemorrhoid creams, increasing fluids, lying on the site and sitz baths.

Medications controlling pain will begin to wear off. This is also true when an epidural or spinal block is given. Uterine contractions are sometimes painful and comfort can be provided by suggesting different positions. Walking around, with assistance, can decrease pain. Since uterine cramping may become more painful during breastfeeding, medications can be given half an hour before nursing. Pain control and comfort can be managed by anticipating the return of sensation and bodily reactions to bruises, tears, incisions and punctured sites.

== Management ==
Immediately after the birth, ongoing assessments are performed with recommendations from the American Academy of Pediatrics and American College of Obstetricians and Gynecologists. They have identified that vital signs of blood pressure, and pulse, uterine position, and bleeding should be assessed every 15 minutes for the first two hours after birth. The temperature is then measured twice, four hours and eight hours after birth. This is to guard against postpartum infections, previously known as childbed fever or puerpal sepsis, one of the main causes of maternal mortality.

The care during the early postpartum period often continues when the patient returns home. A 2023 systematic review found that blood pressure monitoring at home appears to increase patient satisfaction while reducing hypertension-related hospital admissions.

== Nutrition ==
The caloric needs will change based upon the production of milk for the infant. The caloric requirement for a non-breastfeeding, non-pregnant woman changes from 1,800-2,000 kcal/day to 2,300 to 2500 kcal/day for the breastfeeding woman. Nutritional supplementation is often prescribed and recommended. In some instances women are encouraged to continue to take pre-natal vitamins. Increasing the intake of fluids is discussed. The need for additional levels of minerals is most likely due to lactation. Calcium and iron needs increase postpartum. Calories may need to increase by 333 kcal/day during the first four to six weeks postpartum and then by 400 kcal/day 6 months postpartum.

Other foods or substances are not recommended postpartum if breastfeeding because they may have effects on the baby via breastmilk. Some clinicians discourage the use of caffeine. This could produce fussiness in the baby. Alcohol use is strongly discouraged. Consuming fish is healthy and provides vitamins, minerals and proteins. Consumption of oily fish like haddock, herring, sardines, grouper, and tuna may need to be limited due to pollutants.

Weight loss should be monitored to ensure recovery. Quick weight loss can reduce milk supply. Low carb and high protein diets may not be appropriate. A realistic weight loss goal is one pound per week.

== Changes related to cesarean section ==
A urinary catheter is usually put in place before the cesarean section to prevent urinary retention. The abdominal incision will be another site for pain and possible infection. Moving out of bed may be delayed. As with any surgical procedure, the risk is higher for the development of blood clots in the legs. In such cases intermittent pneumatic pressure device may be used or much simpler compression stockings could be given. Leg exercise will also be effective in promoting blood circulation in the legs. Higher levels of pain medication may be needed related to abdominal incisions. If the cesarean was not planned, some women will be disappointed and may benefit from encouraging counseling from clinicians.

== See also ==
- Postpartum care

== Bibliography ==
- Davidson, Michele (2014). Fast facts for the antepartum and postpartum nurse: a nursing orientation and care guide in a nutshell. New York, NY: Springer Publishing Company, LLC. ISBN 978-0-8261-6887-0.
- Durham, Roberta (2014). Maternal-newborn nursing: the critical components of nursing care. Philadelphia: F.A. Davis Company. ISBN 978-0-8036-3704-7.
- Henry, Norma (2016). RN maternal newborn nursing: review module. Stilwell, KS: Assessment Technologies Institute. ISBN 978-1-56533-569-1.
- Jiang, Hong; Qian, Xu; Carroli, Guillermo; Garner, Paul; Jiang, Hong (2017). "Selective versus routine use of episiotomy for vaginal birth". Cochrane Database of Systematic Reviews. 2017 (2) CD000081. doi:10.1002/14651858.CD000081.pub3. PMC 5449575. PMID 28176333.
- Lyon, Deborrah S. (2009). "Postpartum Care". The Global Library of Women's Medicine. doi:10.3843/GLOWM.10143. ISSN 1756-2228.
- Shepherd, E; Grivell, RM (24 July 2020). "Aspirin (single dose) for perineal pain in the early postpartum period". The Cochrane Database of Systematic Reviews. 2020 (7) CD012129. doi:10.1002/14651858.CD012129.pub3. PMC 7388929. PMID 32702783.
- Singh, N; Perfect, JR (1 November 2007). "Immune reconstitution syndrome and exacerbation of infections after pregnancy". Clinical Infectious Diseases. 45 (9): 1192–9. doi:10.1086/522182. PMID 17918082.
