= Monthly nurse =

Occupation

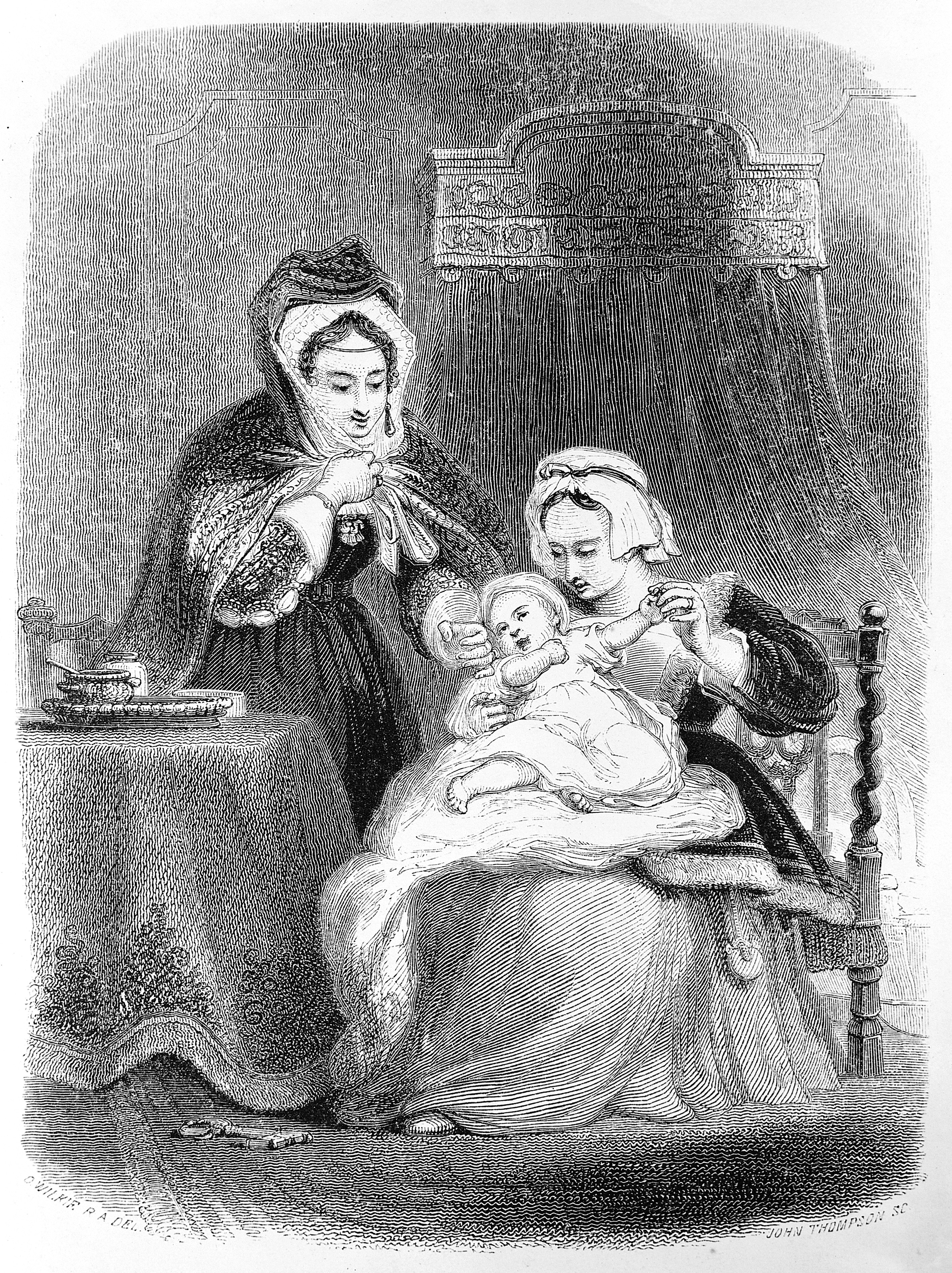
"The Monthly Nurse"

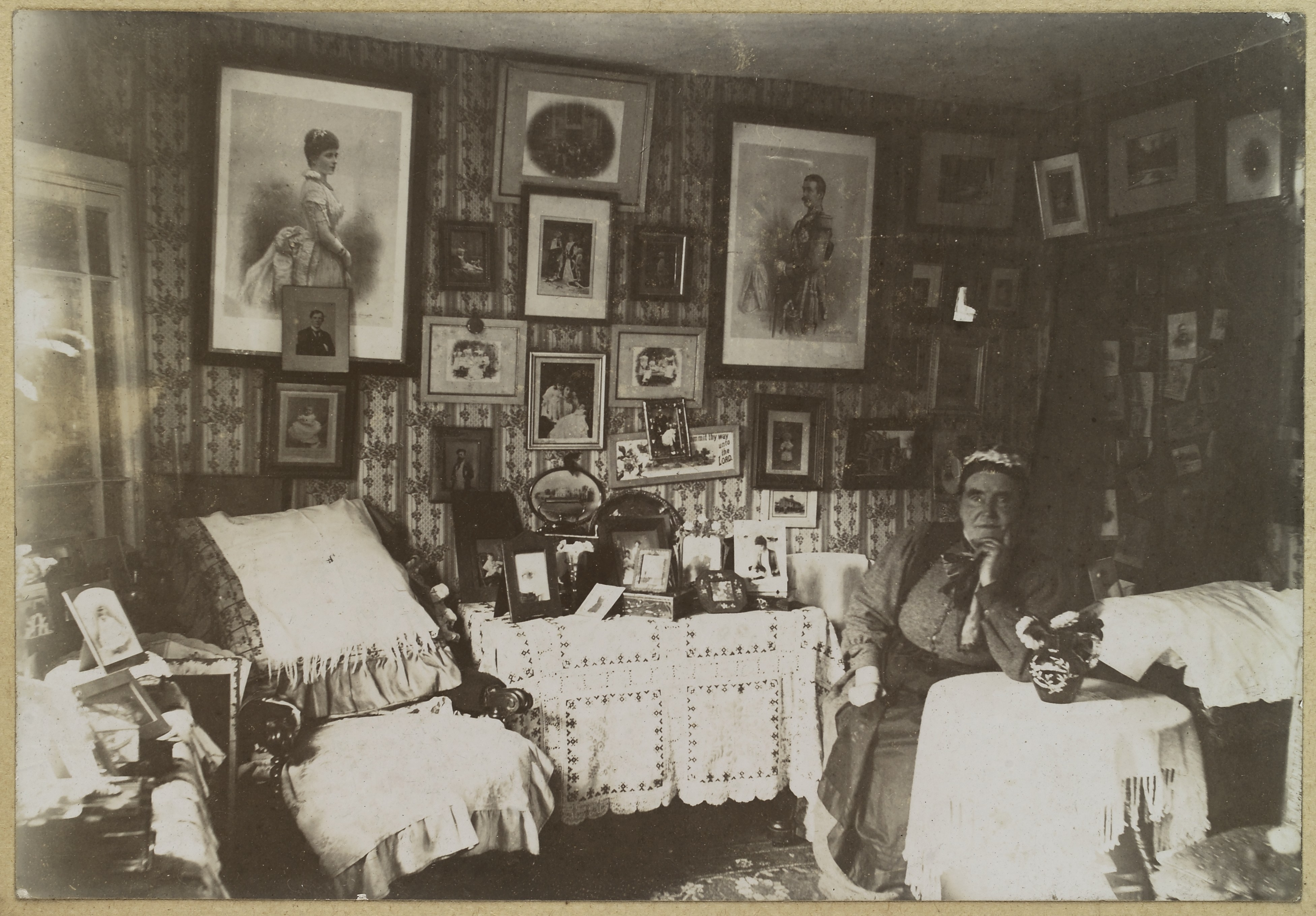
Nurse Tremlow, monthly nurse, in retirement

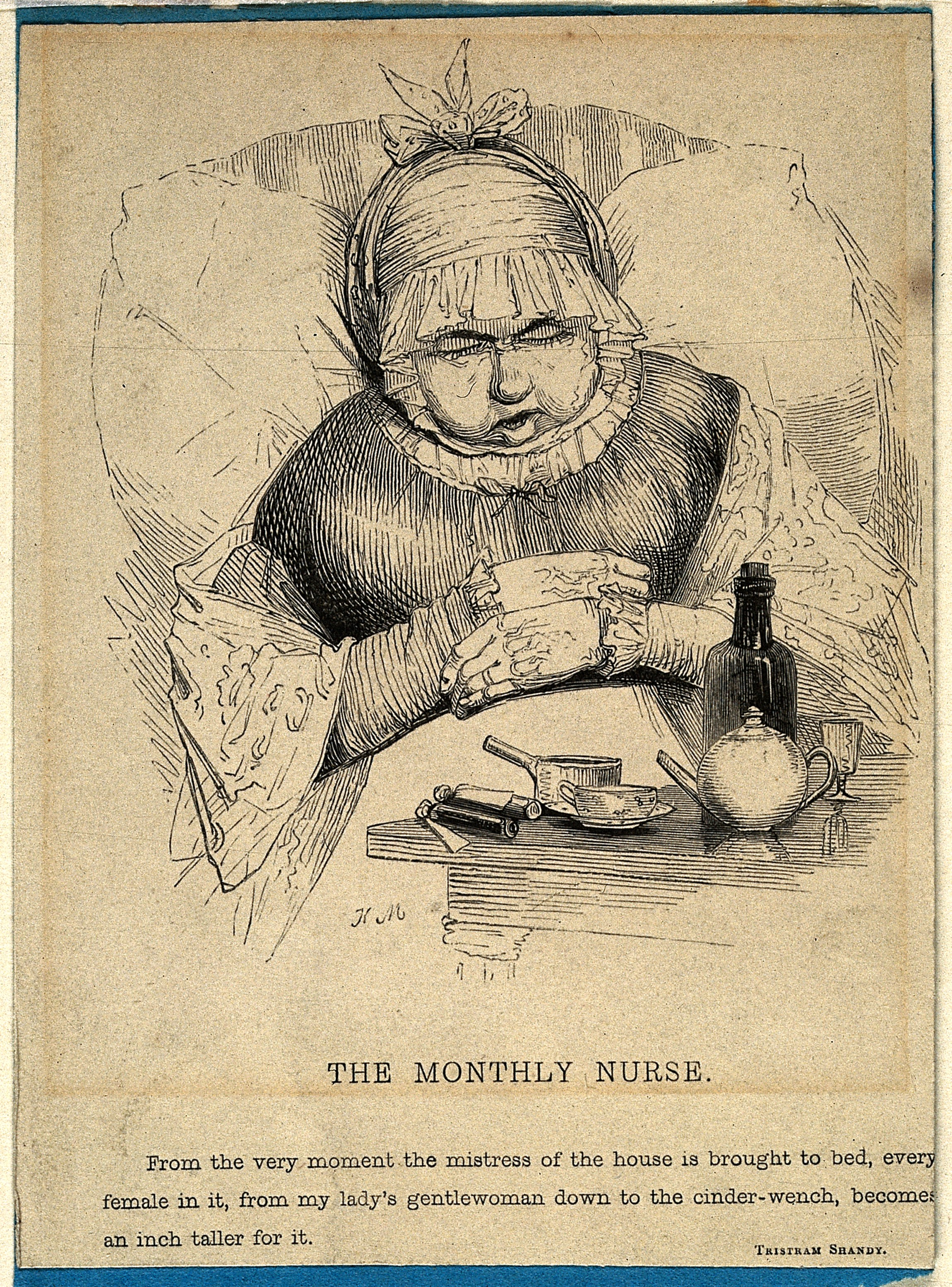
A monthly nurse, who looks after a mother and a newborn baby

A monthly nurse is a woman who looks after a mother and her baby during the postpartum or postnatal period. The phrase is now largely obsolete, but the role is still performed under other names and conditions worldwide.

In the past, it was customary for women to rest in bed or at home for a prolonged period after childbirth. Typically, their female relatives, such as their mother or mother-in-law, would provide care. Alternatively, wealthy families would sometimes hire a monthly nurse. This period, known as confinement or lying-in, would end with the mother's reintroduction to the community during a Christian ceremony called the churching of women. In 18th and 19th century England, the term "monthly nurse" was prevalent since the nurse would usually stay with the patient for four weeks. However, the term "monthly" is not entirely accurate since there was no fixed time or date for the nurse's services to be provided or to end, but rather it was entirely dependent on the arrangement.

The occupation still exists, although now it might be described as "postnatal doula", "maternity nurse" or "newborn care specialist", all are specialist sorts of nannies. A modern version of this rest period has evolved to give maximum support to the new mother, especially if she is recovering from a difficult labor and delivery. It is common in China and its diaspora, where postpartum confinement is known as "sitting the month". These workers can visit the new mother's home daily or live in it for a month and look after them whenever the mother needs help. Conversely, they may work in a central setting, where the new mothers come after they leave the hospital. In Korea, these workers are called Sanhujorisa, and the centers started up in the late 1990s.

== History ==
Historically, midwifery was a skill passed down through generations within families, with the daughter learning from her mother and gaining hands-on experience before becoming a midwife herself. The Church of England supported that by a system of episcopal licensing, which required midwives to swear to some rules regarding contraception, abortion, and concealment of births and also to deliver the newborn infants for baptism or, in extreme cases, to perform the ceremony themselves. However the system of episcopal licensing fell into decline over the latter part of the 17th century, ceasing to exist in London by 1720 and not much later in other areas.

It is unclear exactly when the monthly nurse appeared as an entity. Humfrey commentating in 1891 cites an interplay of factors arising during the 17th and 18th centuries with the advent of instrumentation being used in childbirth and the emergence of "man-midwives". Lying-in hospitals were established in the 18th century and during the 18th/19th centuries the process of childbirth became more medicalised. Much of childbirth remained midwife led but the medical profession was becoming more involved with the surgeon's responsibility being vested around the immediate childbirth process. This raised the question of who would take care of the baby after birth whereas hitherto the roles of nurse and midwife were combined in one person. It was generally thought that the best person to look after her baby was a woman who had had one herself. Often, the task was allotted to motherly or grandmotherly hands, and the "monthly nurse" originated from that requirement for postnatal care. Humfrey writing in The Nursing Record in 1901 reported that "there was little or no attempt at knowledge or instruction, and we know as a fact that ignorance, prejudice and neglect resulted in a goodly crop of errors, wrongs, and woes as regards the hapless infant".

The Nursing Record reported that "nurses who attend the 'artisan' classes in their confinements as a rule pay a visit daily for ten days and then give up the case, as few working class mothers can afford to lie up for longer".

A monthly nurse could earn more than a midwife, as the monthly nurse was employed for periods between 10 days and often much longer and might attend to several women part-time. She often "lived in". The midwife's only duty was perceived as "being trained to assist the parturient woman while nature does her own work and able to call upon a surgeon who could step in where nature fails and skill and science are required". Many certified midwives transferred to the ranks of monthly nurses to benefit from an increased income.

== Certification ==
Although 'registration' was not available for women to act as midwives or monthly nurses, a system of 'certification' existed in the late 19th century and continued into the early 20th century. To qualify, a candidate monthly nurse would attend a course in a lying-in hospital for four or five weeks and a midwife's office for up to three months. They were not financially supported by the hospital and had to bear their own expenses, but they were also given the freedom to practice independently once they completed their training. In 1893, Miss Gosling reported that "although the certificated monthly nurse could be relied upon as being trustworthy and efficient, there were a number of women who attend lectures for a short time and through one cause or another failed to pass their examination and obtain a certificate nevertheless enter a 'Nurses Home' or open one for themselves". Miss Gosling alludes to difficulty of the public not asking to see certification. She also advocates Registration for Monthly Nurses.

As might be expected, rogue institutions issued certificates and diplomas "for a price". Another reporting on a lying in hospital and signing herself a "victim of the system" said that she "witnessed the first phase of the system which turns out yearly hundreds of midwives and monthly nurses on an unsuspecting public. These would be nurses representing almost every grade of the lower classes and every degree of lack of education, and one woman, I remember, could not write. Personally, I found many to be dishonest, untruthful, indescribably dirty in their habits and persons, utterly unprincipled, shockingly coarse and deficient intelligence, and with not the faintest idea of discipline".

=== Training information ===
Articles on the subject of monthly nursing provide differing information as to the length of training provided for the monthly nurse. It appears to be in the region of one to four months, with hospital based training and certification. There appear to be different formulations of training with some combined training for monthly nurses and midwives.

An advertisement in the Nursing Notes and Midwives Chronicle appearing on 1 January 1908 lists over twenty doctors who provide the LCC with lectures for midwives and monthly nurses. This includes a Dr. Feldman of Myrdle St., Commercial Road who lectured in Yiddish.

As has already been mentioned a situation arose whereby qualified nurses and midwives who had undertaken hospital training were in a situation where Monthly Nursing employment was more lucrative and thus underwent further short training to obtain a Monthly Nurse certificate. An example of one such nurse is cited below.

=== Historical records on issues in training of monthly nurses ===
On 27 November 1862 Grailey Hewitt (Physician British Lying In Hospital) writes to a Mr. Bowman and asks for assistance in starting a training scheme for monthly nurses at the British Lying In Hospital.

In 1889 an editorial article appears in The Nursing Record alluding to doctors encouraging women in poor circumstances to train as monthly nurses. The writer stresses the need to firstly train as a nurse, otherwise the monthly nurse training is not long enough. The writer states the view that if attending after labour the monthly (untrained) nurse detracts from the value of skilled attendance after labour. In the view of the writer the monthly nurse should be acquainted with at least the basics of "the Obstetric Art".

In 1903 a letter appears in The Nursing Record from the President and Secretaries of the British Gynaecological Society decrying the state of nurse (monthly nurse) training. The article states a much better standard of training is needed for Monthly and Gynaecological Nurses - the authors of the letter propose to offer a training and refer to the successful training of the Obstetrical Society of London. The writers allude to Fellows of the Society employing nurses for gynaecological cases for which they do not have sufficient training. Their remarks seem to encompass nurses who have trained in larger and smaller hospitals.

=== Certificates and personal diary records ===
Harriett Simpson Cater, monthly nurse, trained at the British Lying-in Hospital. Records pertaining to Harriett Cater are held in the Royal College of Midwives Archive, based within the Royal College of Obstetricians and Gynaecologists These comprise two diaries for which helpfully there is a transcript. These illuminate aspects of her personal and professional life. Harriett was from a poor background and needing to support her wider family she found work as a Monthly Nurse. She worked with affluent famililies and the duration of her engagements often exceeded a month. In addition to her diaries there are certificates also photos and a scrapbook. Harriett initially trained as a nurse at University College Hospital London between 1878 and 1880. In October 1880 she undertook training at the British Lying-in Hospital as a Monthly Nurse. In 1883 Harriett trained as a Midwife at the General Lying-in Hospital, York Rd., Lambeth, London.

Certificates awarded to Dorothy Lizzie Holland are available to view in the London Metropolitan Archives. Holland qualified as a General Nurse on 24 October 1922, then dated 12 June 1923 she has a certificate from The Middlesex Hospital Maternity Department stating she had trained for four months in Monthly Nursing and Midwifery. She subsequently (10 February 1923) obtained a certificate from the Central Midwives Board stating she had passed their examination.

United Kingdom Reform and the 1902 Act

In the late 19th century, reformers were calling not only for registration and recognition of the profession of a midwife but also for the two functions of midwife and monthly nurse to be amalgamated: "The work of midwives lies, for the most part, amongst the poor and the poor lying-in woman needs not only to be delivered, but to be visited for some ten days subsequent to her confinement". The registration of midwives was opposed by members of the House of Lords and Parliament in the United Kingdom for many years, who argued that the delivery of infants was the responsibility of trained doctors and to allow women to do the job, even in straightforward cases, would take away doctors' income. It was not until the Midwives Act 1902, following 12 years of representation by women, that midwives were "registered", but it would still take several years for it to be accepted. The professional training and formal qualification of midwives, and eventually, the postnatal care offered by the National Health Service, saw the end of the monthly nurse.

== See also ==
- Wet nurse
- Canadian Mothercraft Society
- Kraamzorg
- Midwife
