= Maternity hospital =

Hospital for mothers, childbirth, and newborns

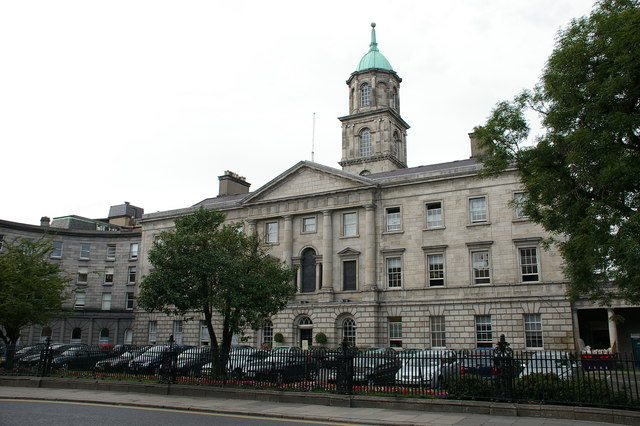
The Rotunda Hospital in Ireland, the oldest continuously-operating maternity hospital in the world

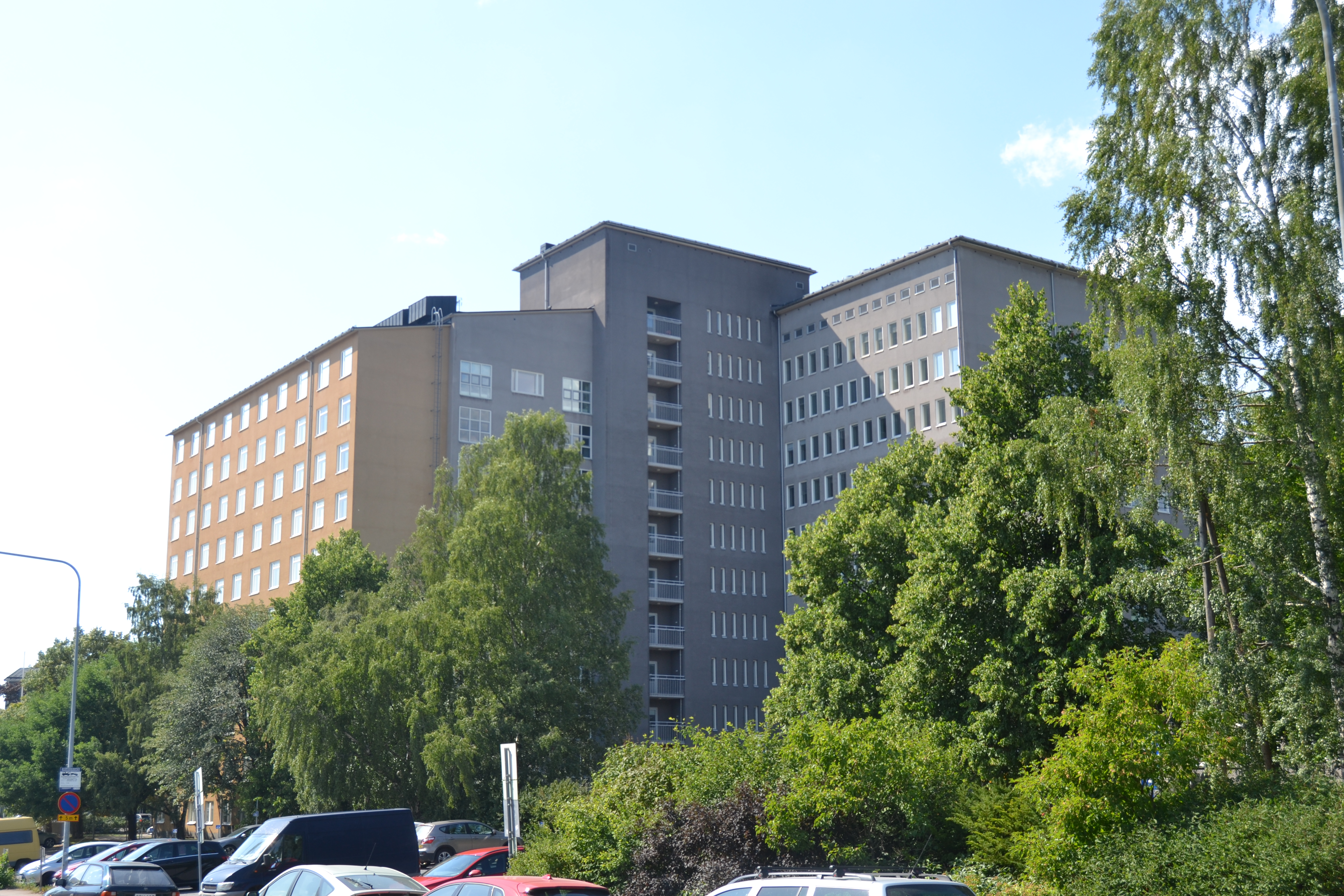
Kätilöopisto, a former maternity hospital in Helsinki, Finland in 2019

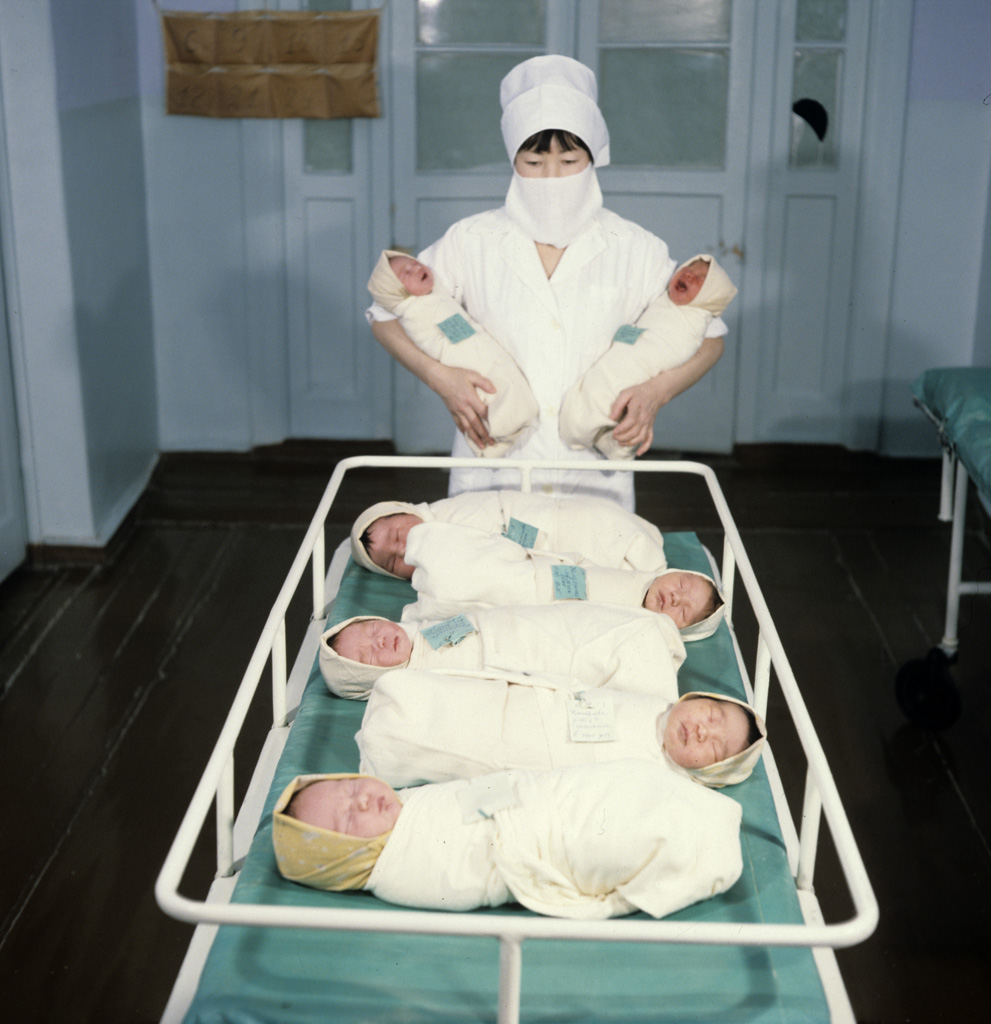
In a maternity hospital in Yakutsk, USSR in 1981

A maternity hospital specializes in caring for women during pregnancy and childbirth. It also provides care for newborn infants, and may act as a centre for clinical training in midwifery and obstetrics. Formerly known as lying-in hospitals, most of them, like cottage hospitals, have been absorbed into larger general hospitals, where they operate as the maternity department.

== History ==
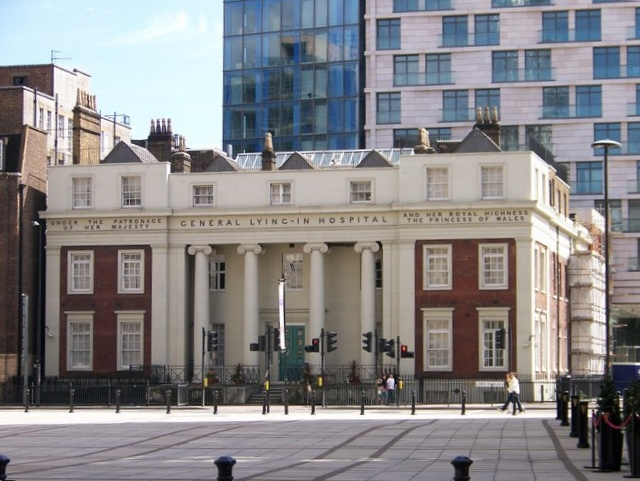
The premises of the former General Lying-In Hospital, now a hotel

Maternity hospitals in the United Kingdom can be traced back to a number of 18th century establishments in London and Dublin. Prior to these foundations, childbirth was a domestic occasion. The term coined for these establishments, but now archaic, is "a lying-in hospital", referring to the custom of lying-in, prolonged bedrest after childbirth, better known now as postpartum confinement.

The first noted lying-in hospital appears to be one founded by Sir Richard Manningham in Jermyn Street, London, in 1739 and which evolved into the Queen Charlotte's Maternity Hospital. A better documented foundation is that of the Dublin Lying-In Hospital, established in 1745 by Bartholomew Mosse, and which served as a model for three subsequent London foundations: the British Lying-In Hospital, a 1749 establishment in Holborn; the 1750 City of London Lying-In Hospital, in the City; and the General Lying-In Hospital on Westminster Bridge Road, established in 1767. A number of other such hospitals were formed in the mid-18th century. All of these were run by male physicians, women being blocked from completing training as doctors until the 1870s.

The first maternity hospital founded and run by a woman was Elizabeth Garrett Anderson's New Hospital for Women, which evolved from an existing dispensary in the 1770s, and was renamed in 1918 the Elizabeth Garrett Anderson Hospital. Its work continues in the modern Elizabeth Garrett Anderson maternity wing of University College Hospital, part of UCLH NHS Foundation Trust.

=== Today ===
The Portland Hospital in central London was created in 1983 as a private hospital, i.e. not part of the National Health Service. Also in 1983, the Rosie Hospital opened in Cambridge, next to Addenbrooke's Hospital.

The National Maternity Hospital, Dublin is the largest mother-and-baby hospital in Ireland.
