= Physiological effects in space =

Effects of spaceflight on the human body

Even before humans began to venture into space, serious and reasonable concerns were expressed about exposure of humans to the microgravity of space due to the potential systemic effects on terrestrially evolved life-forms adapted to Earth gravity. Unloading of skeletal muscle, both on Earth via bed-rest experiments and during spaceflight, result in remodeling of muscle (atrophic response). As a result, decrements occur in skeletal-muscle strength, fatigue resistance, motor performance, and connective-tissue integrity. In addition, weightlessness causes cardiopulmonary and vascular changes, including a significant decrease in red blood cell mass, that affect skeletal muscle function. Normal adaptive response to the microgravity environment may become a liability, resulting in increased risk of an inability or decreased efficiency in crewmember performance of physically demanding tasks during extravehicular activity (EVA) or upon return to Earth.

In the US human space-program, the only in-flight countermeasure to skeletal muscle functional deficits that has been utilized thus far is physical exercise. In-flight exercise hardware and protocols have varied from mission to mission, somewhat dependent on mission duration and the volume of the spacecraft available. Collective knowledge gained from these missions has aided in the evolution of exercise hardware and protocols designed to minimize muscle atrophy and the concomitant deficits in skeletal muscle function. Russian scientists have utilized a variety of exercise hardware and in-flight exercise protocols during long-duration spaceflight (up to and beyond one year) aboard the Mir space station. On the International Space Station (ISS), a combination of resistive and aerobic exercise has been used. Outcomes have been acceptable according to current expectations for crewmember performance on return to Earth. However, for missions to the Moon, establishment of a lunar base, and interplanetary travel to Mars, the functional requirements for human performance during each specific phase of these missions have not been sufficiently defined to determine whether currently developed countermeasures are adequate to meet physical performance requirements.

Research access to human crewmembers during space flight is limited. Earth-bound physiologic models have been developed and findings reviewed. Models include horizontal or head-down bed rest, dry immersion bed rest, limb immobilization, and unilateral lower-limb suspension. While none of these ground-based analogs provides a perfect simulation of human microgravity exposure during spaceflight, each is useful for study of particular aspects of muscle unloading as well as for investigation of sensorimotor alterations.

Development, evaluation and validation of new countermeasures to the effects of skeletal muscle unloading will likely employ variations of these same basic ground-based models. Prospective countermeasures may include pharmacologic and/or dietary interventions, innovative exercise hardware providing improved loading modalities, locomotor training devices, passive exercise devices, and artificial gravity (either as an integral component of the spacecraft or in a discrete device contained within it). With respect to the latter, the hemodynamic and metabolic responses to increased loading provided by a human-powered centrifuge have been described.

== Historical overview ==
=== U.S. human spaceflight programs ===
==== Mercury and Gemini ====
Prior to launch of the first American astronaut, suborbital flights of non-human primates (chimpanzees) demonstrated that launch and entry, as well as short-duration microgravity exposure, were all survivable events.

The initial biomedical problem faced by Project Mercury (which ran from 1959 – 1963) was establishment of selection criteria for the first group of astronauts. Medical requirements for the Mercury astronauts were formulated by the NASA Life Sciences Committee, an advisory group of distinguished physicians and life scientists. Final selection criteria included results of medical testing as well as the candidates' technical expertise and experience. Aeromedical personnel and facilities of the Department of Defense were summoned to provide the stress and psychological testing of astronaut candidates. The screening and testing procedures defined for the selection of Mercury astronauts served as the basis for subsequent selection of Gemini and Apollo astronauts when those programs were initiated.

While the Mercury flights were largely demonstration flights, the longest Mercury mission being only about 34 hours, Project Mercury clearly demonstrated that humans could tolerate the spaceflight environment without major acute physiological effects and some useful biomedical information was obtained, which included the following:

- Pilot performance capability as unaltered by spaceflight
- All measured physiological functions remained within acceptable normal limits
- No signs of abnormal sensory or psychological responses were observed
- The radiation dose received was considered insignificant from a medical perspective
- Immediately after landing, an orthostatic rise in heart rate and drop in systemic blood pressure were noted, which persisted for 7 to 19 hours post landing

Because of the short mission durations of Project Mercury, there was little concern about loss of musculoskeletal function; hence no exercise hardware or protocols were developed for use during flight. However, the selection criteria ensured that astronauts were in excellent physical condition before flight.

Biomedical information acquired during the Mercury flights provided a positive basis to proceed with the next step, the Gemini Program, which took place during the 20 months from March 1965 to November 1966. The major stated objective of the Gemini Program was to achieve a high level of operational confidence with human spaceflight. To prepare for a lunar landing mission, three major goals had to be realized. These were:

1. to accomplish rendezvous and docking of two space vehicles
2. to perform extravehicular activities and to validate human life support systems and astronaut performance capabilities under such conditions
3. (germane to this topic) to develop a better understanding of how humans tolerate extended periods of weightless flight exposure

Thus, Project Gemini provided a much better opportunity to study the effects of the microgravity of spaceflight on humans. In the 14-day Gemini 7 flight, salient observations were undertaken to more carefully examine the physiological and psychological responses of astronauts as a result of exposure to spaceflight and the associated microgravity environment.

The Gemini Program resulted in about 2000 man-hours of weightless exposure of U.S. astronauts. Additional observations included the presence of postflight orthostatic intolerance that was still present for up to 50 hours after landing in soe crewmembers, a decrease in red cell mass of 5 – 20% from preflight levels, and radiographic indications of bone demineralization in the calcaneus. No significant decrements in performance of mission objectives were noted and no specific measurements of muscle strength or endurance were obtained that compared preflight, in-flight and postflight levels.

==== Apollo ====
The major objective of the Apollo Program was the landing of astronauts on the lunar surface and their subsequent safe return to Earth. The Apollo (1968–1973) biomedical results were collected from 11 crewed missions that were completed within the five-year span of the Apollo Program, from pre-lunar flights (missions 7 through 10); the first lunar landing (mission 11), and five subsequent lunar exploratory flights (mission 12 through 17). Apollo 13 did not complete its intended lunar landing mission because of a pressure vessel explosion in the Service Module. Instead, it returned safely to Earth after attaining a partial lunar orbit.

Essential to the successful completion of the Apollo Program was the requirement for some crew members to undertake long and strenuous periods of extravehicular activity (EVA) on the lunar surface. There was concern about the capability of crew members to accomplish the lunar surface excursions planned for some of the Apollo missions. Although reduced lunar gravity was expected to make some tasks less strenuous, reduced suit mobility coupled with a complex and ambitious timeline led to the prediction that metabolic activity would exceed resulting levels for extended periods. Since the nature and magnitude of physiological dysfunction resulting from microgravity exposure had not yet been established (and is still not concisely defined), suitable physiological testing was completed within the constraints of the Apollo Program to determine if crewmember physiological responses to exercise were altered as a consequence of spaceflight.

Initial planning for the Apollo Program included provisions for in-flight measurements of salient parameters of concern including physiological responses to exercise. However, the fire in the Apollo 204 spacecraft (also known as Apollo 1), fatal to astronauts Grissom, White, and Chaffee, resulted in NASA management initiating changes in the program that eliminated such prospects. This, investigators were left with only the possibility to conduct pre-flight and post-flight exercise response studies and to assume that these findings reflected alterations of cardiopulmonary and skeletal muscle function secondary to microgravity exposure. It was realized early on that within the context and constraints imposed by the realities of the Apollo missions, the inability to control certain experiment variables would present challenges to many biomedical investigations. Firstly, re-adaption to Earth gravity procedures introduced additional challenges to a well-controlled experiment design since Apollo crew members spent variable amounts of time in an uncomfortably warm spacecraft bobbing in the ocean and additionally, orbital mechanics constraints on re-entry times imposed crew recovery times that prevented the possibility of conducting pre- and post-flight testing within a similar circadian schedule. The effect of these uncontrollable conditions and that of other physical and psychological stresses could not be separated from responses attributable to microgravity exposure alone. Thus, data relating to the physiological responses to exercise stress in Apollo astronauts must be interpreted within this overall context.

No standardized in-flight exercise program was planned for any of the Apollo flights; however, an exercise device (Figure 6-1) was provided on some missions. Crewmembers, when situated in the Command Module (CM), typically used the exerciser several time per day for periods of 15–20 minutes.

The pre- and post-flight testing consisted of graded exercise tests conducted on a bicycle ergometer. Heart rate was used for determining stress levels, and the same heart rate levels were used for pre- and postflight testing.

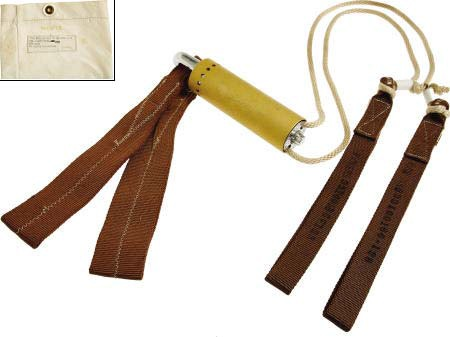
Figure 6-1: The exercise device used on some Apollo missions was based on the Exer-Genie developed by Exer-Genie, Inc., Fullerton, CA. Within the cylinder, the nylon cords rotate around a shaft, developing controlled resistance. The cords are attached to loop handles. When not in use, the flight device was stored in a cloth bag (inset).

Although the exact duration of each stress level was adjusted slightly (1–2 minutes) for the later Apollo missions to obtain additional measurements, the graded stress protocol included exercise levels of 120, 140 and 160 beats per minute, corresponding to the light, medium, and heavy work respectively for each individual. For the Apollo 9 and 10 missions, a stress level of 180 beats per minute was added. The entire test protocol was conducted three times within a 30-day period before lift-off. Postflight tests were conducted on recovery (landing) day and once more at 24 to 36 hours after recovery.

During each test, workload, heart rate, blood pressure, and respiratory gas exchange (oxygen consumption, carbon dioxide production, and minute volume) measurements were made. For Apollo 15 to 17 missions, cardiac output measurements were obtained by the single-breath technique. Arteriovenous oxygen differences were calculated from the measured oxygen consumption and cardiac output data.

The data collected were voluminous and are summarized in tabular form by Rummel et al. Dietlein has provided a concise synopsis of the findings. In brief, reduced work capacity and oxygen consumption of significant degree was noted in 67% (18 of 27) of the Apollo crewmembers tested on recovery. This decrement was transient, and 85% of those tested (23 of 27) returned to preflight baseline levels within 24–36 hours. A significant decrement in cardiac stroke volume was associated with diminished exercise tolerance. It was not clear whether the exercise decrement had its onset during flight. If it did, the Apollo data did not reveal the precise in-flight time course because of lack of in-flight measurement capabilities. The astronauts' performance on the lunar surface provided no reason to believe that any serious exercise tolerance decrement occurred during flight, except that related to lack of regular exercise and muscle disuse atrophy.

The studies completed during Apollo, although less than optimal, left no doubt that a decrement in exercise tolerance occurred in the period immediately after landing, although it is believed that such decrements were not present during surface EVA. It seems likely that multiple factors are responsible for the observed decrements. Lack of sufficient exercise and development of muscle disuse atrophy probably contributed. Catabolic tissue processes may have been accentuated by increased cortisol secretion as a consequence of mission stress and individual crew member reaction to such stress. Additional factors associated with the return to Earth's gravity may also be implicated. This, the observed diminished stroke volume (cardiac output) is certainly contributory and, in turn, is a reflection of diminished venous return and contracted effective circulating blood volume induced by spaceflight factors. Skeletal muscle atrophy is mentioned with respect to its possible contribution to exercise intolerance, and in some of the later Apollo flights lower limb girth measurements were completed (data not published) that provided the first evidence for loss of muscle mass in the legs.

==== Skylab ====
The Skylab program (May 1973 – November 1974) was from the onset, intended to provide a life sciences laboratory in space. A significant number of experiments were conducted to provide physiologic data from humans exposed to long-duration stays in a microgravity environment.

A 56-day ground-based simulation of many of the Skylab experiments, conducted in an environmentally controlled, enclosed chamber, was termed the Skylab Medical Experiments Altitude Test and represented the first mission. The three subsequent orbital missions were termed Skylab 2, 3 and 4. These three long-duration mission were 28, 56 and 84 days in duration, respectively. Collectively, the Skylab missions achieved a milestone in providing a vast array of human spaceflight biomedical information during missions of longer duration than any previous mission.

With respect to the current issue of loss of muscle mass and function, two key studies were performed during the course of the three Skylab orbital missions. First, leg and arm volumes were calculated by measuring the girth (circumference) of contiguous 3-centimeter arm and leg segments, treating all the segments as a short tapered cylinder, and then summing the segment volumes to obtain the volume of each extremity.

The second study included the first muscle strength measurements by means of a dynamometer. In addition to measurements relating directly to skeletal muscle strength and mass, indirect measurements were made that demonstrated that all Skylab crewmembers had a negative nitrogen balance indicative of skeletal muscle attrition. This was also observed 10 years later in short-duration Space Shuttle crewmembers.

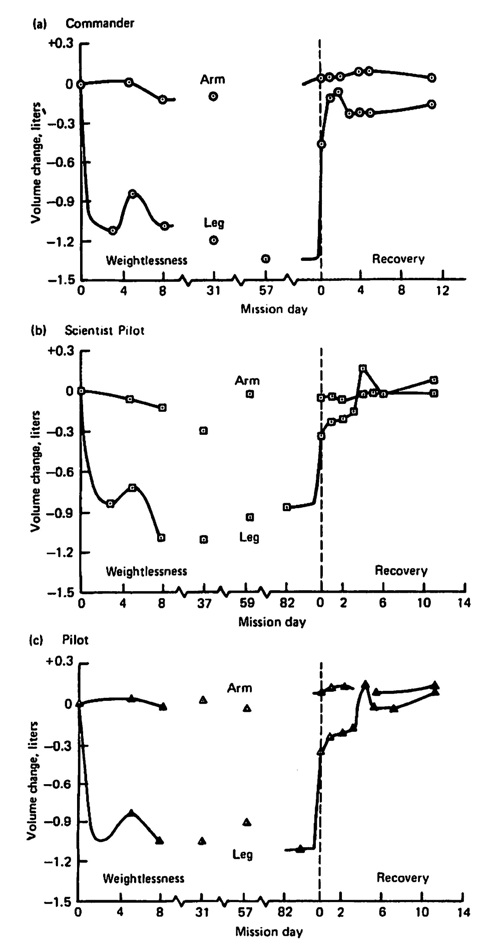
Figure 6-2. Changes in upper and lower limb volumes obtained by circumference measurements of 3-cm segments in the three crewmembers from Skylab 4. Because of a much higher exercise volume in the Skylab 4 crewmembers, their loss of muscle volume was much less than observed in crewmembers from Skylab 2 and 3. From reference.

Upper and lower limb volumes obtained on the three crewmembers of Skylab 4 are shown in figure 6-2. Fluid shifts contributed the largest changes to lower limb volumes, but loss of leg tissue mass is clearly evident, particularly in the Commander. As shown in the graphs, significant loss of leg volume occurs within the first few days of microgravity exposure while changes in the upper limbs are less remarkable. Upon return to Earth, much of the loss of leg volume is corrected and there is often a short over-correction or overshoot. Once this fluid shift resolves, the true loss of muscle mass remaining in the legs is revealed that more slowly returns to the baseline or preflight level (see figure 6-2, leg during recovery on right side of graph for all three crewmembers).

In the Skylab 4 Commander, the loss in leg volume appears to be nearly 300 cc. (figure 6-2, topmost graph). Because the complement of exercise equipment for this mission was the largest (consisting of a cycle ergometer, passive treadmill, and the "Mini gym", modified commercial devices that provided the capability for low-load resistive exercises) losses in muscle mass and strength were less than in the previous two missions of shorter duration.

During the Skylab program, exercises and exercise devices were added incrementally and the testing expanded with each mission. This produced a different exercise environment for each flight so that in reality, there were three separate but related orbital experiments, each with N=3. The results from each mission significantly affected the next.

Preflight and postflight evaluation of muscle strength was performed on the right arm and leg of each crewmember for all three Skylab orbital missions by means of a Cybex isokinetic dynamometer. The protocol completed on each crewmember included a thorough warm-up, and 10 maximum-effort full flexions and extensions of the arm at the elbow and of the hip and knee at an angular rate of 45° per second. The isokinetic leg strength from all three missions, as well as body weights and leg volumes, are presented in Figure 6-3.

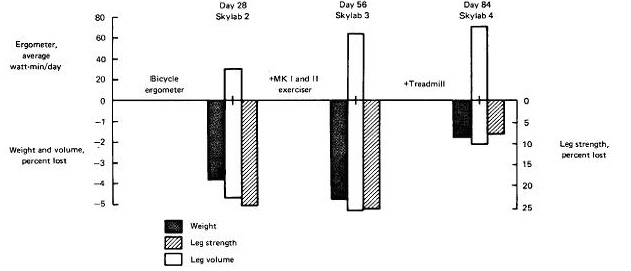
Figure 6-3. Average changes in body weight, isokinetic leg strength, and leg volume of crewmembers on the three Skylab missions. Only the bicycle ergometer was used on Skylab 2, the MK I and MK II "Mini Gym" exercisers were added for Skylab 3, and a passive "treadmill" was flown on Skylab 4. The average work load per day on the cycle ergometer is also provided by mission for comparison. From reference.

On Skylab 2, only the bicycle ergometer was available for the in-flight exercise, with testing performed 18 days before launch and 5 days after landing. While it was realized that these times were too temporally remote from the flight, this was the best that could be achieved due to schedule constraints. By the time day 5 muscle testing was completed, some recovery in function had likely occurred; however, a marked decrement still remained. The decrement in leg extensor strength was nearly 25%; the arms suffered less but also exhibited marked losses (data not shown). The Commander's arm extensors showed no loss, since he used these muscles in hand-pedaling the bicycle, being the only Skylab crewmember to adopt this mode of arm exercise. This illustrated a fundamental point in muscle conditioning: to maintain the strength of a muscle, it must be stressed to or near the level at which it will have to function. Leg extensor muscles, important in standing and providing propulsive forces during walking, are capable of generating forces of hundreds of pounds, while the arm extensor forces are measured in tens of pounds. Forces developed in pedaling a bicycle ergometer are typically tens of pounds and are thus incapable of maintaining leg strength. The bicycle ergometer proved to be an excellent machine for aerobic exercise and cardiovascular conditioning, but it was not capable of developing either the type or level of forces needed to maintain strength for walking under 1G.

Immediately after Skylab 2, work was started on devices to provide adequate exercise to arms, trunk, and legs. A commercial device, termed "Mini Gym", was modified extensively and designated "MK-I". Only exercises that primarily benefited arms and trunk were achievable with this device. While forces transmitted to the legs were greater than those from the cycle ergometer, they were still limited to an inadequate level, since this level could not exceed the maximum strength of the arms, which represents a fraction of leg strength.

A second device, designated "MK-II", consisted of a pair of handles between which up to five extension springs could be attached, allowing development of maximum forces of 25 pounds per foot. These two devices were flown on Skylab 3, and in-flight nutrition support and exercise time and food were increased. The crew performed many repetitions per day of their favorite maneuvers on the MK-I and to a lesser extent, on the MK-II. Also, the average amount of work done on the bicycle ergometer was more than doubled on Skylab 3, with all crewmembers participating actively.

It was perceived by Skylb life scientists that a device that allowed walking and running under forces equivalent to Earth gravity would provide more strenuous exercise. Immediately after completion of Skylab 2, work was begun on a treadmill for Skylab 4. As mission preparation progressed, the launch weight of Skylab 4 escalated so much that the final design of the treadmill was constrained by weight limitations. The final weight for the device was a mere 3.5 pounds. This passive device (figure 6-4) consisted of a Teflon-coated aluminum walking surface attached to the Skylab iso-grid floor. Four rubber bungee cords provided an equivalent weight of about 80 kilograms (175 lbs) and were attached to a shoulder and waist harness worn by crewmembers during use. By angling the bungee cords to that the user was pulled slightly forward, an equivalent to a slippery hill was created. High loads were placed on some leg muscles, especially the calf, and fatigue was so rapid that the device could not be used for significant aerobic work because of the bungee/harness design. It was absolutely necessary to wear socks and no shoes to provide a low-friction interface to the Teflon surface.

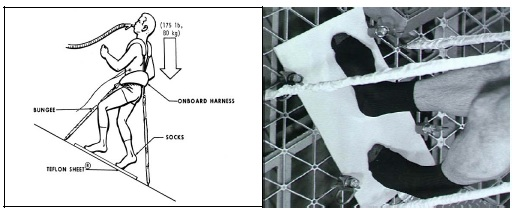
Figure 6-4. The first U.S. "treadmill" utilized during spaceflight was a passive device used only on the Skylab 4 mission of 84 d duration. The high loading (175 lbs) via bungee cords provided more of a resistive rather than an aerobic modality. It consisted of a Teflon-coated aluminum plate attached to the Skylab isogrid floor. The exercising crewmember wore a waist and shoulder harness that attached to the iso-grid floor surrounding the treadmill plate by means of 4 bungee cords. Socks had to be worn to provide a low-friction interface between the plantar surface of the feet and the Teflon-coated treadmill plate. From reference.

On Skylab 4, the crew used the bicycle ergometer at essentially the same rate as on Skylab 3, as well as the MK-I and MK-II Mini Gym exercisers. In addition, they typically performed 10 minutes per day of walking, jumping and jogging on the treadmill. Food intake had again been increased.

Upon their return to Earth and even before muscle testing, it was apparent that the Skylab 4 crewmembers were in very good physical condition. They were able to stand and walk for long periods without apparent difficulty on the day after landing (R+1), in contrast to the crewmembers from the earlier two missions. Results of strength testing confirmed a surprisingly small loss in leg strength even after nearly 3 months of microgravity exposure (figure 6-3). In fact, knee extensor strength increased over the pre-flight level (figure 6-13).

==== Space Shuttle ====
A variety of investigations related to skeletal muscle function have been completed during the course of the Space Shuttle Program (1981–2011). The most comprehensive of these was a suite of investigations accomplished during the Extended Duration Orbiter Medical Project (EDOMP), which was carried out during 1989 – 1995 with missions of up to 16 days. Studies most relevant to the risk on which this report focuses include the following Detailed Scientific Objectives (DSO):

- DSO 475 – Direct assessment of muscle atrophy and biochemistry before and after spaceflight
- DSO 606 – Evaluating concentric and eccentric skeletal muscle contractions after spaceflight
- DSO 617 – Evaluating functional muscle performance

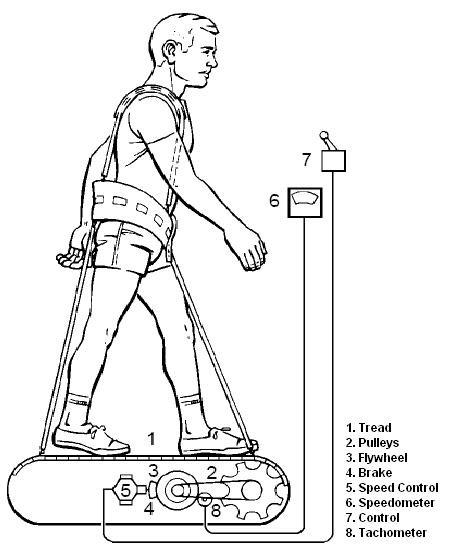
Figure 6-5. First-generation or original Space Shuttle passive treadmill. From reference.

The collective specific aim of DSO 477 and DSO 617 was to evaluate functional changes in concentric and eccentric strength (peak torque) and endurance (fatigue index) of the trunk, arms, and legs of crewmembers before and after flight. LIDO® dynamometer located at the Johnson Space Center and at both the prime and contingency landing sites were used to evaluate concentric and eccentric contractions before and after flight.

Test subjects in this study exercised during flight for various durations, intensities and numbers of days on the original Shuttle treadmill (figure 6-5) (as opposed to the EDO treadmill, which flew on later Shuttle missions and was the bases for the ISS treadmill) as part of separate in-flight investigations. Exercise protocols included continuous and interval training, with prescriptions varying from 60% to 85% of preflight maximal oxygen uptake as estimated from heart rate (HR) Some subjects had difficulty in achieving or maintaining their target HR during flight. The brake (figure 6-5). A harness and bungee/tether system was used to simulate body weight by providing forces equivalent to an approximate 1-G body mass. Subjects on this non-motorized treadmill were required to walk and run at a positive percentage grade to overcome mechanical friction. Study participants were familiarized with the LIDO® test protocol and procedures about 30 days before launch (L-30), after which six test sessions were conducted. Three sessions were completed before launch (L-21, L-14 and L-8 days) and three after landing (R+0, R+2 and R+7 to R+10 days).

The muscle groups tested are shown in table 6-1. Torque and work data were extracted from force-position curves. Peak-torque, total work, and fatigue index measured in the three preflight test sessions were compared; when no differences were found between sessions, values from the three preflight sessions were averaged and this average was used to compare preflight values with those on landing day and during the postflight period.

Skeletal-muscle strength was defined as the peak torque generated throughout a range of motion from three consecutive voluntary contractions for flexion and extension. Eccentric contractions are actions of the muscle in which force is generated while the muscle is lengthening, as opposed to the concentric actions in which the muscle is shortening (contracting) while generating force. Skeletal-muscle endurance was defined as the total work generated during 25 repetitions of concentric knee exercise, as determined from the area under the torque curve for a complete exercise set. Work also was compared between the first 8 and last 8 repetitions. Endurance parameters were measured during concentric knee flexion and extension activity only. On R+0, significant decreases in concentric and eccentric strength were shown in the back and abdomen when compared to the preflight means (table 6-1).

Table 6-1. Mean percent change on landing day from preflight mean, for skeletal muscle concentric and eccentric strength of various muscle groups.
Muscle Group	Test Mode	
Muscle Group	Concentric	Eccentric
Back	−23 (±4)*	−14 (±4)*
Abdomen	−10 (±2)*	−8 (±2)*
Quadriceps	−12 (±3)*	−7 (±3)
Hamstrings	−6 (±3)	−1 (±0)
Tibialis Anterior	−8 (±4)	−1 (±2)
Gastroc/Soleus	1 (±3)	2 (±4)
Deltoids	1 (±5)	−2 (±2)
Pecs/Lats	0 (±5)	−6 (±2)*
Biceps	6 (±6)	1 (±2)
Triceps	0 (±2)	8 (±6)
*Preflight >R+0 (p < ); n=17	Landing day (R+0) versus average of 3 preflight measures. From reference (14)	

Concentric back extension and eccentric dorsiflexion remained significantly less than preflight values on R+7. Recovery (an increase in peak torque from R+0 to R+7) was demonstrated for the eccentric abdomen and the concentric and eccentric back extensors.

However, the data depicted in table 6-1 may be somewhat misleading because in some cases there were tremendous differences in strength between crewmembers who exercised during flight versus those who did not. For example, some crewmembers who exercised during flight actually gained in isokinetically measured strength in the ankle extensor/flexor muscles (anterior versus posterior calf muscles, that is m. tibialis anterior versus the gastrocnemius/soleus complex) compared to crewmembers who did not exercise and who actually showed a decrease in isokinetically measured strength in these muscles (figure 6-6).

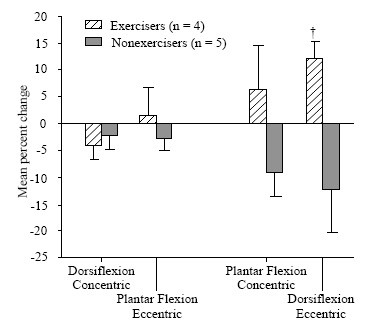
Figure 6-6. Percent change in isokinetic strength in ankle extensor and flexor muscles for crewmembers who exercised during flight versus those who did not. †Preflight < R+0 (p < 0.05). From reference.

With respect to endurance, a majority of the decrease in the total quadriceps work occurred on R+0. This likely reflects significant loss in the first third of the exercise bout (−11%). The declines in peak torque at the faster endurance test velocities are consistent with changes seen at the slower angular velocity used during the strength tests. Torque for the quadriceps at 75° per second was 15% less than preflight values but for the hamstrings was 12% less than the preflight mean at 60° per second. Endurance data showed little difference between preflight and R+7 tests, suggesting that crewmembers had returned to baseline by 1 week after landing.

Additionally, subjects who did exercise during flight compared to those who did not had significantly greater (p < 0.05) losses within 5 hours of landing in concentric strength of the back, concentric and eccentric strength of the quadriceps (30° per second), and eccentric strength of the hamstrings, relative to the respective preflight values (data not shown here). According to Greenisen et al., non-exercisers also had significantly less concentric strength of the quadriceps at 75° per second and lower total work extension, work first-third flexion, and work last-third extension, immediately after landing, than before flight. The conclusions reached by the investigators were that the data indicate that muscles are less able to maintain endurance and resist fatigue after spaceflight, and that exercise may avert decrements in these aspects of endurance.

Conversely, crewmembers who exercised during flight had greater losses in trunk muscles strength as measured at landing than did the non-exercising group (figure 6-7). However, preflight strength in trunk flexion and extension was substantially greater in the exercising group than in the non-exercising group. Apparently treadmill exercise did not prevent decrements in trunk strength after 9 to 11 days of spaceflight, and the investigators proffered the explanation that preservation of muscle function may be limited only to those muscles that are effectively used as part of the exercise regimen.

Figure 6-7. Percent change in isokinetic strength in trunk muscles in crewmembers who exercised during flight versus those who did not. †Pre > R+0 (p < 0.05). From reference.

The specific aim of DSO 475, "Direct Assessment of Muscle Atrophy Before and After Short Spaceflight" was to define the morphologic and biochemical effects of spaceflight on skeletal fibers. To obtain myofiber biomechanical and morphological data from Space Shuttle crewmembers, biopsies were conducted once before flight (L – > 21 days) and again on landing day (R+0). The subjects were eight crewmembers, three from a 5-day mission and five from an 11-day mission. Biopsies of the mid-portion of the m. vastus lateralis were obtained by means of a 6-mm biopsy needle with suction assist. A one-tailed paired t-test was used to identify significant differences (p < 0.05) between the mean values of fiber cross-sectional area (CSA), fiber distribution, and number of capillaries of all crewmembers before flight and the mean values for all crewmembers after flight.

According to this report, CSA of slow-twitch (Type I) fibers in postflight biopsies was 15% less than in preflight biopsies; the CSA of fast-twitch (Type II) fibers was 22% less after flight than before (figure 6-8). Mean values did not reflect the considerable variation seen in the biopsies from the eight astronauts who participated. At least some of this variation likely resulted from differences in the types and quantities of preflight and in-flight countermeasures (exercise or lower body negative pressure) used by the different crewmembers. The relative proportions of Type I and Type II fibers were different before and after the 11 day mission: the fiber distribution also seemed to follow the same trend after the 5 day mission (more Type II and fewer Type I fibers after than before), but the sample size was too small to reach statistical significance. The number of capillaries per fiber was significantly reduced after 11 days of spaceflight.

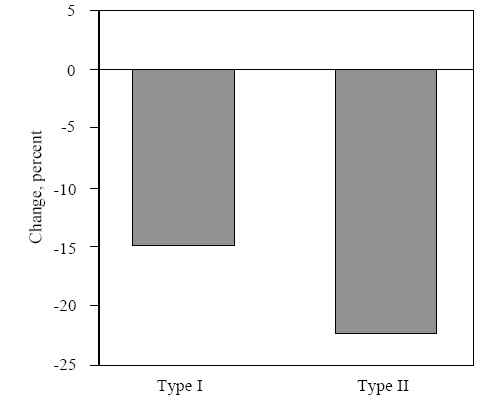
Figure 6-8. Percent change in CSA of Type I (slow twitch) and Type II (fast twitch) myofibers in postflight versus preflight muscle biopsies from 8 crewmembers. From reference.

However, since the mean fiber size was also reduced, the number of capillaries per unit of CSA of skeletal muscle tissue remained the same. Atrophy of both major myofiber types, with atrophy of Type II > Type I, is somewhat different from the more selective Type I myofiber atrophy observed in unloaded Sprague-Dawley and Wistar rat muscle representing an uncommon case in which difference exist between responses of human and murine skeletal muscle.

The purpose of DSO 606, "Quantifying Skeletal Muscle SIze by Magnetic Resonance Imaging (MRI)", was to non-invasively quantify changes in size, water, and lipid composition in antigravity (leg) muscles after spaceflight. This experiment was the first attempt to measure limb volumes before and after flight since the less sophisticated methods of measuring limb girths during Apollo and SKylab programs were used. The subjects included a total of eight Space Shuttle crewmembers, five from a 7-day flight and three from a 9-day flight. All subjects completed one preflight and two postflight tests on either L-30 or L-16 and on R+2 and R+7. Testing involved obtaining an MRI scan of the leg (soleus and gastrocnemius) at The University of Texas – Houston Health Science Center, Hermann Hospital. Multi-slice axial images of the leg were obtained to identify and locate various muscle groups. Changes in water and lipid content were measured, in addition to CSA, to distinguish changes in fluid versus tissue volumes. Multiple slices were measured by computerized planimetry.

CSA and volume of the total leg compartment, soleus, and gastrocnemius were evaluated to assess the degree of skeletal muscle atrophy. The volumes of all 3 compartments were significantly smaller (p < 0.05) after both the 7 and 9 day Shuttle flights than they were before flight. Volume decreased by 5.8% in the soleus, 4.0% in the gastrocnemius, and 4.3% in the total compartment. These losses were stated to represent the true level of skeletal muscle tissue atrophy and not changes associated with fluid shifts. No recovery was apparent by 7 days after landing (data not shown). This finding indicates that the losses were not due to fluid shifts, but the delay in recovery after these rather short flights is contrary to what was observed and documented during the Skylab program of flights much longer in duration, albeit by less sophisticated methods during Skylab.

The Space Shuttle Program and, in particular, EDOMP has provided a great deal of knowledge about the effects of spaceflight on human physiology and specifically on alterations in skeletal muscle mass, strength, and function. Once again, losses of skeletal muscle mass, strength, and endurance were documented, in some cases in spite of exercise countermeasures. But some findings were encouraging, particularly indications that in-flight exercise does have a positive effect in countering losses in muscle strength at least in the legs (see table 6-1 and figure 6-6), as predicted from the results of the 84-day Skylab 4 mission when multiple modesof exercise were used including a unique "treadmill" device (see figure 6-4). This unusual treadmill provided loads of sufficient magnitude to the legs in a fashion approaching resistance exercise. However, the data provided by MRI volume studies indicate that not all crewmembers, despite utilization of various exercise countermeasures, escape the loss in muscle mass that has been documented during most of the history of U.S. human spaceflight since Project Mercury. This, additional research is needed to continue the development of countermeasures and equipment that will eventually provide a successful solution for all human space travelers.

==== Shuttle-Mir and NASA-Mir ====
During the seven NASA-Mir flights, seven U.S. astronauts trained and flew jointly with 12 Russian cosmonauts over a total period of 977 days (the average stay was 140 days) of spaceflight, which occurred during the period from March 1995 to June 1998. The major contribution of the joint U.S./Russian effort on the Mir space station relevant to the current risk topic was the first use of MRI to investigate volume changes in the skeletal muscles of astronauts and cosmonauts exposed to long-duration spaceflight. This began with the first joint mission, Mir-18, and continued until the final Mir-25 mission. The data indicated that loss of muscle volume, particularly in the legs and back, was greater than with short-duration spaceflight but not as great as the data from short-duration flight might have predicted. A comparison between volume losses in the selected muscle groups in short-duration spaceflight on the Space Shuttle, long-duration (119 d) bed rest, and a (115 d) Shuttle-Mir mission demonstrates the relative time course of the losses (figure 6-9).

Figure 6-9. Percent change in selected muscle groups during short (8 d; n = 8) and long (115 d; n = 3) spaceflight (Mir 18) compared to long-duration bed rest (119 d). Data from references and the Shuttle/Mir Final Report.

There is good correlation between long-duration bed rest and spaceflight of similar duration except that losses in the back muscles are much less with bed rest. This likely reflects use of these muscles during bed rest to adjust body position and to reduce the potential for vascular compression and tissue injury. During spaceflight the back muscles are apparently less used because they do not have to support the upright body against Earth gravity and are not used with great force to make positional adjustments of the body as they are during the recumbency of bed rest.

==== International Space Station (ISS) ====
The International Space Station's (ISS) first crew (Expedition 1) arrived in October 2000; since then there have been 15 additional Increments. The data presented here were collected during the first 11 of the ISS Expeditions.

The complexities and shortcomings of collecting scientific data from a laboratory orbiting more than 300 miles above the Earth and completing 18 orbits per day at a speed of more than 17,000 mph with discontinuous voice and data communications, combined with the constraints and limitations of up mass, crew time, and on-board logistics, cannot be overstated.

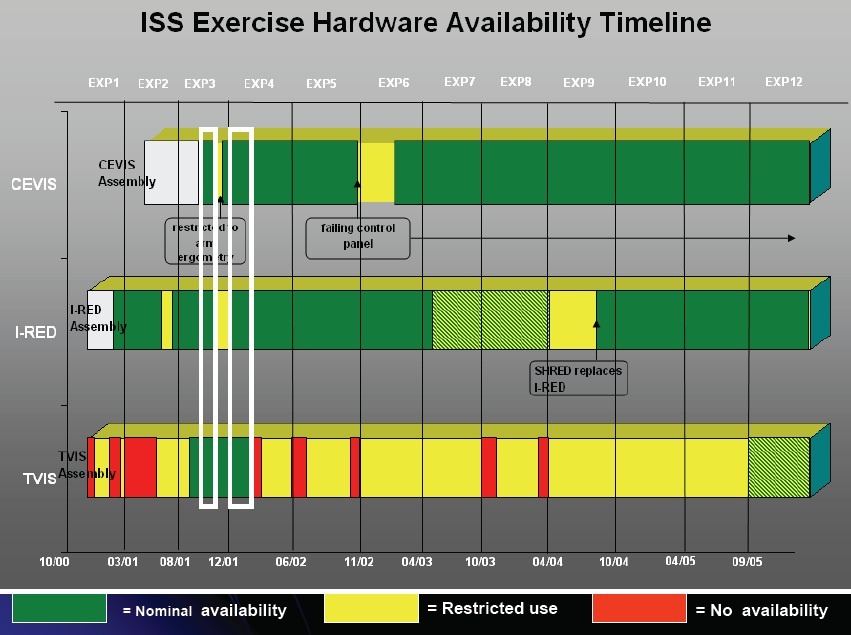
Figure 6-10. Exercise equipment failures and other constraints have limited the access of ISS crewmembers to the full complement of aerobic and resistance exercise protocols. Full capability for all 3 devices was present only for 2 short windows during Expeditions 3 and 4 (tall white rectangles).

Another problem was exercise hardware that was built and launched but failed to meet science requirements. (The Resistive Exercise Device [RED] science requirement was to provide a load of up to an equivalent of 600 lbs., but the Interim Resistive Exercise Device (iRED) provides only half of that amount. Ground-based studies have shown that it does produce a positive training effect similar to equivalent free weights when used in a high-intensity program, but it will likely not provide sufficient load in a zero-gravity environment to prevent loss of muscle and bone tissue, as determined from parabolic flight studies.) Other problems were failure at one time or another of each piece of onboard exercise hardware with reduced utilization at other times, and other limitations imposed because transmission of forces to the space frame have confounded inflight exercise sessions. In fact, during the first eleven ISS Expeditions, only for 2 short periods during Expeditions 3 and 4 were all three U.S. onboard exercise devices (Cycle Egometer with Vibration Isolation System [CEVIS], Treadmill with Vibration Isolation System, and iRED) capable of being used under nominal conditions (Figure 6-10). The almost continuously suboptimal availability of exercise equipment likely has reduced maintenance of crew physical fitness.

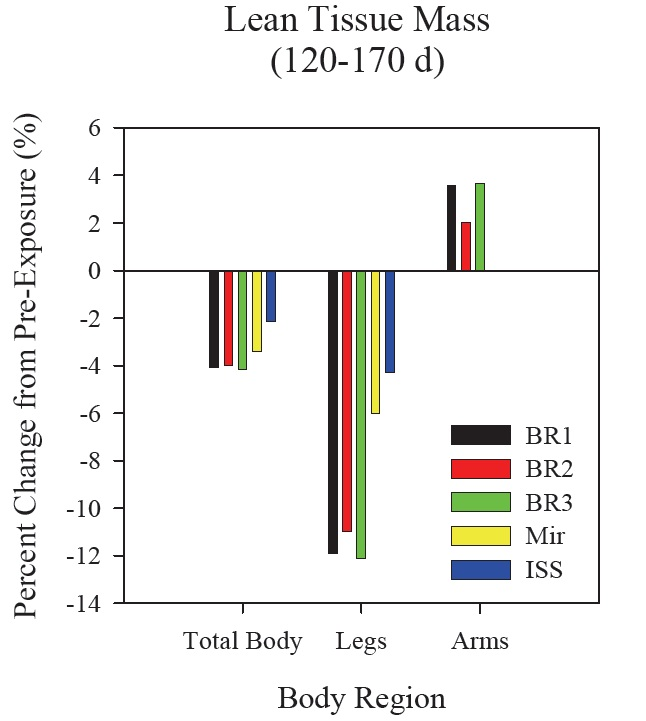
Figure 6-11. Lean tissue mass losses in percent change from preflight for NASA-Mir, ISS, and three bed rest studies from 120 to 170 days in duration.

Despite these shortcomings, lean tissue mass data collected by means of dual-energy x-ray absorptiometry (DEXA) before and after flight compares favorably with data from NASAMir, and the total body and leg losses are in fact less than seen during NASA-Mir or during three separate bed rest studies of similar durations in the range of 20–170 d (Figure 6-11). However, the news is not entirely good since knee extensor and knee flexor strength losses in long-duration crewmembers after flights aboard Mir and ISS were ~23% and ~25%, respectively (Figure 6-12), indicating that strength losses in the quadriceps and hamstring muscle groups were significant and similar for NASA-Mir and early ISS missions, despite apparent slightly increased preservation of muscle mass (lean tissue) in the legs of ISS crewmembers compared to crewmembers on NASA-Mir missions (also Figure 6-11). These near equivalent losses occurred in spite of iRED being present on the ISS. Unfortunately, MRI data collected by Fitts and colleagues to assess skeletal muscle volumes in ISS crewmembers are not yet available to allow comparison with those from NASA-Mir. With respect to endurance, the following comparison (Figure 6-13) shows a trend for improved maintenance of muscle endurance on ISS with respect to NASA-Mir although the loss of endurance on ISS was greater than that documented during short-duration Space Shuttle missions (for ISS, n = 2).

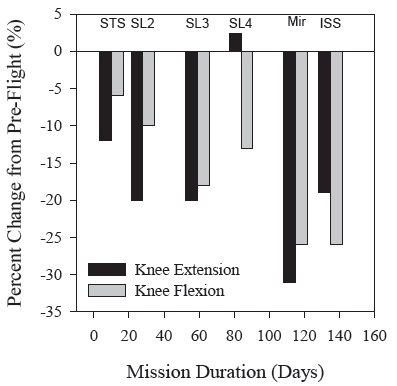
Figure 6-12. Comparison of postflight percent change in knee extensor and flexor strength from preflight in Shuttle (STS), the three Skylab missions (SL2-4), NASA-Mir (Mir), and ISS.

ISS crewmembers, under the supervision of their crew surgeons, participate in a postflight exercise program implemented by certified trainers who comprise the Astronaut Strength, Conditioning and Rehabilitation (ASCR) group at Johnson Space Center. A portion of this program includes physical fitness testing on an individual basis. The results of these "functional" tests, which consist of six exercises, reveal that crewmembers return with less physical capability than when they launch but that most of the decrements are reversed by postflight day 30 secondary to the ground-based exercises the crewmembers complete in the days after their return to Earth (Figures 14 and 15).

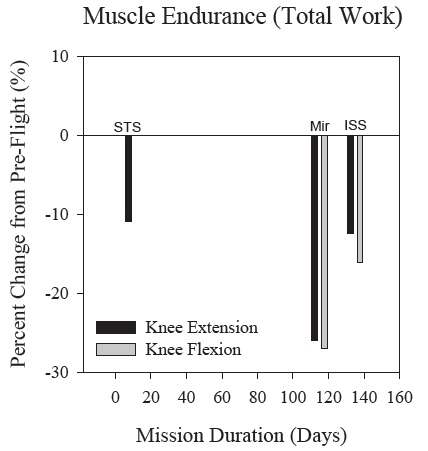
Figure 6-13. Postflight (R+0) percent change from preflight measures in muscle endurance at the knee expressed as total work for Space Shuttle (STS), NASA-Mir (Mir) and ISS (for ISS, n = 2).

In this section, only the historical highlights of some highly relevant skeletal muscle investigations have been included and discussed. A complete treatment of all data would cover several volumes. However, from this brief historical overview it is possible to see how initial indications of losses in skeletal muscle function led to attempts to provide exercise countermeasures. Such countermeasures were utilized during spaceflight, crewmembers were tested upon return, and exercise regimens and equipment were modified for use in future missions. In the subsequent sections, human spaceflight and ground-based analog studies and experimental animal studies are reviewed that contribute to the evidence base on the alterations in skeletal muscle form and function that occur with the muscle unloading associated with the microgravity environment. It is this knowledge base on which future operational countermeasures and investigations into the fundamental changes in muscle physiology will be based.

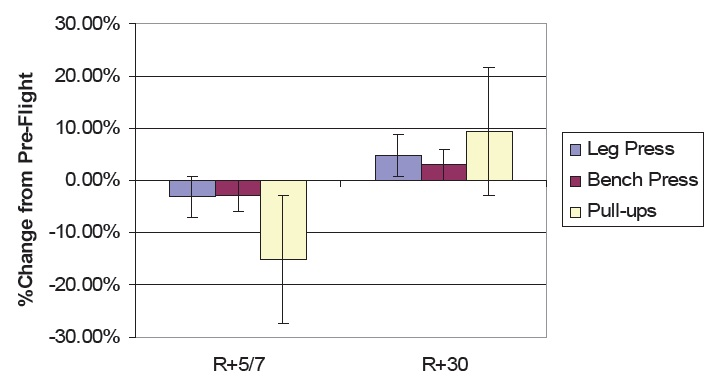
Figure 6-14. Results of functional fitness testing in crewmembers from ISS Expeditions 1–11. Percent change from before flight at postflight days 5/7 and 30.

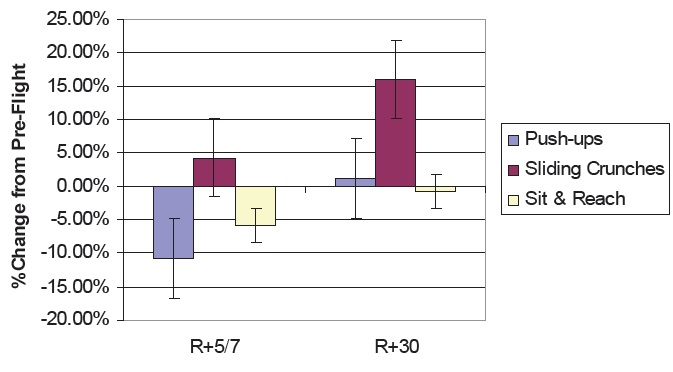
Figure 6-15. Results of functional fitness testing in crewmembers from ISS Expeditions 1–11. Percent change from before flight at postflight days 5/7 and 30.

=== Other human spaceflight ===
The responses of the human body to microgravity exposure during spaceflight involve adaptations at numerous levels. It is believed that skeletal muscle adaptations to microgravity, which affect both muscle mass and function, involve structural alterations in the neural as well as the myofibrillar components of skeletal muscle. It is well accepted that the muscles involved in the maintenance of an upright position in terrestrial gravity (the antigravity muscles) are the most susceptible to spaceflight-induced adaptations. This susceptibility may reflect the almost continuous levels of self-generated (active) and environmentally generated (reactive) mechanical loading to which these muscles are exposed under normal Earth gravity. Thus, effects related to the decrease in the level of mechanical loading that occurs during microgravity exposure logically would be reflected most acutely in these muscles. Changes at the structural level within skeletal muscle after spaceflight are paralleled by spaceflight-induced changes at the functional level such as decreased muscle strength and increased muscle fatigability. This summary addresses nearly exclusively those investigations in which the effects of mechanical unloading on antigravity muscles were examined, and the consequent tissue remodeling at the structural and biochemical levels. Additionally, the relative success of various countermeasures is examined.

Decreases in skeletal muscle size and function have been reported since humans first began to explore space. Spaceflight results in the loss of lean body mass as determined by body composition measurements. Urinary amino acid and nitrogen excretion, both indirect measures of catabolism of lean body mass, are elevated during both brief and long spaceflights. Direct measurement of protein synthesis during spaceflight using 15N-glycine incorporation as a marker revealed an increase in whole-body protein synthesis rates. These results indicated that the significant decrease in lean body mass observed after spaceflight must be associated with a significant increase in protein degradation rates rather than an inhibition of protein synthesis. Decreases in lower-limb muscle circumference and calculated muscle volumes were detected in Apollo and Spacelab astronauts. Decreases in muscle strength, circumference, and tone have also been reported in cosmonauts. More recently, these findings have been confirmed by direct volume measurements (by magnetic resonance imaging [MRI] of astronauts on the Space Shuttle and of Russian cosmonauts and U.S. astronauts after tours of duty on the Mir space station.

Changes in lean body mass and muscle volume are paralleled by a concomitant decrease in myofiber cross-sectional area (CSA). To date, preflight and postflight muscle biopsy samples have been obtained from only a few crewmembers. In U.S. studies, muscle biopsies were obtained before and after flight from the m. vastus lateralis of 8 astronauts after 5- and 11-day missions. Notably, postflight muscle sampling was carried out within 2–3 hours of landing, which minimized the effects of reambulation on the muscle. Analysis of the muscle biopsy samples with a variety of morphologic, histochemical, and biochemical techniques indicated that the myofiber CSA was significantly decreased after spaceflight; that atrophy was greatest in Type IIB myofibers, followed by Type IIA and then Type I myofibers; that expression of Type II myosin heavy chain (MHC) protein was significantly increased, with an apparent decrease in the amount of Type I MHC protein expressed; and that the number of myonuclei per mm of myofiber length was significantly decreased in Type II myofibers after 11 days of spaceflight. In contrast to these findings, analysis of needle biopsy samples from cosmonauts, conducted by the Institute for Biomedical Problems after 76- and 180-day flights, indicated a large degree of individual variation in the extent of myofiber atrophy, with the decrease in myofiber CSA ranging from about 4% to 20%. This variation was attributed to variations in compliance with exercise countermeasures by individual cosmonauts during the flights.

More recent muscle biopsy studies have indicated that despite consistent decreases in myofiber CSA in the m. soleus and m. gastrocnemius after spaceflight, MHC expression does not seem to shift, as was previously described by Zhou et al. This discrepancy may reflect the effects of exercise countermeasure protocols carried out by the astronauts during the later flight and the examination of muscles different from those studied in the earlier flight (gastrocnemius and soleus vs. vastus lateralis).

Decrements in the aerobic capacity of crewmembers after spaceflight, coupled with a reduction in muscle oxidative capacity, indicate that the vascular supply to skeletal muscle may also be affected by spaceflight. However, at present no consistent relationship is apparent between the degree of muscle atrophy (measured by MRI or myofiber CSA determination after muscle biopsy) and the reported changes in muscle strength and function, although typically loss in muscle strength exceeds the loss in muscle volume. The reasons for these counter-intuitive results are unclear and will probably remain so until resources become available for long-term, on-orbit study of the skeletal muscle atrophic response to spaceflight.

In addition to the effects of spaceflight on the myofibrillar component of skeletal muscle, the role of the neural components of skeletal muscle atrophy must not be understated. A functional disruption of neuronal control at the neuromuscular level, which seems to be paralleled by a reduction in the overall electrical activity of the muscle after spaceflight, raises the possibility that neuron-derived factors that play a role in the growth or maintenance of skeletal muscle may be disrupted. The hypothesis that microgravity causes a fundamental alteration in motor control has also been suggested. Studies conducted at JSC by the Exercise Physiology Laboratory showed that two-legged muscle power declines considerably more than can be explained by the loss in muscle mass alone. Additionally, the loss of explosive leg power was associated with a substantial reduction in the electromyography (EMG) activity of the m. rectus femoris, m. vastus lateralis, and m. vastus medialis. These investigators concluded that microgravity induced a basic change in motor control and coordination such that motor activation of extensor muscles was reduced. Similar observations have been made after long-duration spaceflight on Mir and ISS.

Evidence exists that exercise strategies are effective in attenuating muscle strength loss in bed rest. Bamman et al. preserved pre-bed rest muscle strength of the thigh and calf in subjects who performed resistive exercise with loads equivalent to 80–85% of their pre-bed rest strength (Repetition maximum test). Protection of muscle volume occurred through the maintenance of protein synthesis, which also likely influenced muscle strength. Similarly, Akima et al. were able to maintain isometric peak torque in subjects who performed daily maximal isometric contractions of the knee extensors during 20 days of bed rest. Using an aggressive resistive exercise training protocol, Shackelford et al. preserved isokinetic muscle strength and observed substantial increases in isotonic muscle strength over the course of 89 days of bed rest in exercising subjects. Using a flywheel resistive exercise device, Alkner and Tesch prevented the loss of muscle mass and strength in the thigh and attenuated the losses in the calf.

The similarity in skeletal muscle responses during spaceflight and bed rest were elegantly demonstrated by Trappe and colleagues in a combined 17-day spaceflight study of 4 crewmembers and a 17-day bed rest study of 8 test subjects. In all of these subjects, assessment of muscle fiber size, composition, and in vivo contractile characteristics of the calf muscle were completed. Protocols and timelines for the two studies were identical, which allowed direct comparisons between a spaceflight and a bed rest study of equivalent duration. Calf muscle strength was measured before and on days 2, 8, and 12 of spaceflight and bed rest as well as on days 2 and 8 after spaceflight and bed rest in the two investigations. Muscle biopsies were obtained before and within 3 hours after spaceflight (m. gastrocnemius and m. soleus) and bed rest (m. soleus) just before reloading. After 17 days of spaceflight or bed rest, no significant measurable changes occurred in maximal isometric calf strength, force-velocity characteristics, myofiber composition, or volume in the calf muscles studied. Since loss of skeletal muscle strength is an expected finding in both spaceflight and bed rest, the investigators concluded that the testing protocol utilized during both studies must have provided sufficient resistance exercise to prevent losses in muscle strength and changes in morphology.

Some general conclusions that can be drawn from the data gathered from astronaut/cosmonaut studies are as follows. First, loss of muscle mass is most prevalent in the antigravity muscles such as the soleus; second, the atrophic response to short-term spaceflight does not seem to be specific to myofiber type; and third, myosin heavy chain (MHC) isoform expression does not seem to shift from Type I MHC to Type II during short (< 18-day) spaceflights.

=== Ground-based analog studies ===
Several ground-based paradigms have been used to emulate the effects of microgravity unloading on human skeletal muscle, including complete horizontal or 6° head-down-tilt bed rest, dry immersion, and unilateral upper- and lower-limb unloading with or without joint immobilization. In general, skeletal muscle responses to unloading have been similar in all of these models. Although no perfect simulation of crew activities and the microgravity environment can be adequately achieved, Adams and colleagues have suggested that bed rest is an appropriate model of spaceflight for studying skeletal muscle physiologic adaptations and countermeasures.

Bed rest unloading causes a significant loss of body nitrogen and lean body mass. A reduction in the size or volume of the ambulatory muscles accounts for most of the decrease in lean body mass after bed rest. This decrease correlates with a significant reduction in muscle protein synthesis. Horizontal and 6° head-down-tilt bed rest protocols of various durations (7 days, 14 days, 30 days, 5 weeks, or 17 weeks) have resulted in significant reductions in lower-limb muscle volume as measured by MRI, ranging from a 30% loss in the ankle extensor muscles to a 12% loss in the plantar flexors (gastrocnemius and soleus). Decreases in muscle volume after bed rest were paralleled by decreases in muscle strength and endurance, as evidenced by significant decreases in angle-specific torque, isokinetic muscle strength, and fatigability. Similar losses in muscle volume, paralleled by decreases in muscle strength and endurance, have been observed after unilateral lower-limb suspension. Dry immersion, a whole-body-unloading paradigm with the added advantage of mimicking the reduced proprioceptive input encountered during spaceflight, also brings about reductions in muscle volume, strength, endurance, electrical activity, and tone.

At the structural level, the loss of muscle volume in these models correlates with a significant decrease in CSA of both Type I and Type II myofibers. In general, Type II myofibers seem to be more likely to atrophy than do Type I myofibers during short-term unloading, with no significant myofiber type shifting being observed, although alterations in total muscle MHC protein isoform expression have been reported. However, prolonged bed rest (greater than 80 days) does significantly change the number of MHC hybrid fibers observed in the soleus muscle. Immobilization by limb casting does not seem to reduce the relative proportions of muscle-specific proteins, such as carbonic anhydrase II and myoglobin, over that predicted by the overall decrease in muscle protein synthesis. In contrast, experimental evidence suggests that the specific activity of muscle enzymes involved in oxidative metabolism, such as pyruvate dehydrogenase, is decreased by cast immobilization. A similar reduction in the activity of citrate synthase, but not phosphofructokinase, has been detected in the vastus lateralis, indicating a significant impairment of the oxidative capacity in this muscle after unilateral limb suspension. The differences observed between cast immobilization and unilateral limb suspension or bed rest protocols may reflect the former being a better model of muscle atrophy induced by hypokinesia and the latter two being better models of muscle atrophy induced by muscle hypodynamia. The latter situation more closely resembles the actual conditions experienced by crewmembers during spaceflight, namely removal of mechanical loading without a reduction in limb mobility. However, it is apparent that although ground-based unloading models are useful in studying the effects of microgravity on skeletal muscle, no single terrestrial model system produces all the physiological adaptations in skeletal muscle observed as a consequence of spaceflight. Absent from human analog studies are the unique operational and psychological stressors associated with spaceflight that exacerbate the physiological changes resulting from muscle unloading.

Again, the decreases in muscle volume and myofiber CSA observed in these ground-based analogs of spaceflight bring about changes in the neuronal-activation patterns of the unloaded muscles, including decreased electrically evoked maximal force, reduced maximal integrated electromyography, and neuromuscular junction dysfunction. Certainly such decreases in the neural drive in unloaded muscle play a role in the atrophic response.

As in spaceflight, adaptations to unloading can be observed after short-duration bed rest. For example, after 20 d of bed rest, volume of quadriceps muscle decreased by 8%, hamstrings decreased by 10%, and plantar flexor muscles were reduced by 14%. During a longer, 89-d bed rest, greater reductions in muscle volume in the quadriceps (−15%), hamstrings (−13%), soleus (−29%), and gastrocnemius (−28%) were reported. In a 90-day bed rest trial, a 26% ± 7 decline in the CSA of the calf muscle was observed. This rate of decline is consistent with earlier measurements in which after 90 days of bed rest, a roughly 15% decline in quadriceps and hamstring muscle volume measured by MRI scans were noted in two subjects. Reductions in muscle strength were also demonstrated in these studies.

Bamman and colleagues observed losses of 18, 17, and 13% in concentric, eccentric, and isometric plantar flexor peak torque, respectively, after 14 d of bed rest, and Akima and his co-investigators observed a 16% decrease in knee extensor isometric torque after 20 days of bed rest. Although not specifically reported, subjects in an 89-day bed rest trial experienced significant reductions in isokinetic torque in the lower body, with the greatest losses in the knee extensors (−35%). This study also used isotonic testing (1RM), and mean losses ranging from −6 to −37% were observed; reductions in adductor, abductor, and leg press strength were on the order of ~25–30%. In an earlier 90-day bed rest trial, LeBlanc and colleagues observed losses of 31% in knee extension strength and 15% in knee flexion strength. Few studies have reported changes in the ab/adductor or the flexor/extensor muscles of the hip. Shackelford et al. reported that isotonic strength decreased by about 25% in the adductors, but only a 6% decrease in the hip flexors was demonstrated after 17 weeks of bed rest. After 55 days of bed rest, Berg et al. reported that a 22% reduction in isometric hip extension occurred, although the extensor muscles in the gluteal region decreased in volume by only 2%. The authors reported no explanation for this discrepancy between the proportion of reduced strength relative to the loss of mass, and also stated that no previous studies in the literature had made these concurrent strength/volume measurements in the hip musculature.

Some general conclusions that can be drawn from the above human studies are as follows. First, terrestrial unloading models produce selective atrophy in the muscles of the lower limbs, especially the anti-gravity muscles; second, this response is greater in the extensor muscles than in the flexor muscles; third, muscle atrophy occurs quickly (within 7–14 days) in response to unloading; fourth, loss of muscle mass is paralleled by decrements in muscle strength and endurance, but strength losses typically are greater than volume losses; fifth, if atrophy is specific to a myofiber type within these muscles, it seems to be Type II myofibers; and sixth, terrestrial unloading does not seem to produce a slow-to-fast shift in absolute myofiber characteristics but does alter the expression of MHC isoforms in human muscle so that an increase in MHC hybrid myofibers is observed, resulting in a faster phenotype.

Other research findings exist that relate peripherally to this risk description that should remain associated with it. The physical inactivity and muscle unloading occurring in association with spaceflight can result in a decrease in muscle mass, which in turn may be associated with an increased susceptibility to insulin resistance (glucose intolerance). While this association is quite clearly documented in bed rest studies, the association is not yet solidified for spaceflight. Additionally, the major countermeasure to muscle atrophy is exercise, and it should be appreciated that crewmembers chronically exposed to the microgravity environment may develop impaired body temperature regulation during rest and exercise that may lead to heat strain and injury. These are discussed more fully in the paragraphs that follow.

After short-duration spaceflights, Soviet cosmonauts were observed to have elevated serum insulin levels that persisted up to 7 d after landing. In the first 28 U.S. Space Shuttle flights (2–11 d duration), serum insulin levels (n = 129) were elevated by 55% on landing day compared to before flight. Russian space life science investigators reported two-fold or greater increases in insulin levels in three cosmonauts within 1 day after they returned from a 237-d flight. The associated finding of elevations in both insulin and blood glucose (12% on landing day compared to preflight levels in 129 Space Shuttle crewmembers on flights of 2–11 d duration) may indicate an acquired decreased tissue sensitivity to insulin associated with spaceflight. Ground-based bed rest studies simulating weightlessness in humans have shown an increased insulin response to glucose tolerance tests. In such studies, plasma insulin levels have increased up to four-fold compared to those of control subjects, and blood glucose levels exceeded those of the controls 2 h after glucose loading. In a well-designed 7-d bed rest study, insulin action on both whole-body glucose uptake rate and leg glucose uptake rate was investigated. It was concluded that the inactive muscle of bed rested subjects was less sensitive to circulating insulin. However, in a study of four Space Shuttle astronauts by the same investigators, in which glucose tolerance tests were performed 15 d before launch, on flight day 7, and on postflight days 2 and 15, increases in the concentrations of insulin, glucose, and Cpeptide in in-flight samples were observed, but the changes were not significantly different from the preflight and postflight values. The investigators concluded that 7 d of spaceflight did not confirm the assumption that microgravity exposure leads to impaired glucose tolerance. However, the brief (7 d) exposure to microgravity may have been insufficient in duration to induce statistically significant changes, and thus additional studies on crewmembers from long duration missions are needed to confirm these findings.

Human expenditure of energy results in the generation of heat. The body heat generated by normal activities, and particularly by exercise, triggers homeostatic regulatory mechanisms with the goal of maintaining body core temperature within its relatively narrow, safe physiologic range by means of vasoregulation and diaphoresis. The weightlessness environment of spaceflight may impair heat dissipation by reducing evaporative and conductive heat exchange. Microgravity and spaceflight may perturb the body's thermoregulatory mechanisms by altering the work efficiency, metabolic rate, or circadian rhythms of heat production. Additionally, human space travelers are often not well hydrated, have a 10–15% decrease in intravascular fluid (plasma) volume, and may lose both their preflight muscular and cardiovascular fitness levels as well as their thermoregulatory capabilities. As a result, they may become less heat-acclimated or may acquire an altered thermal sensitivity.

Alterations in thermoregulation in association with spaceflight could significantly affect a variety of spaceflight-associated activities including exercise as a countermeasure to muscle atrophy, cardiac deconditioning, and bone loss; extravehicular activity (EVA); and vehicle landing and egress. EVA suits and launch and entry or advanced crew escape suits (ACES) worn by ISS and Shuttle crewmembers are designed to provide an impermeable barrier between the wearer and the external environment. To compensate for lack of heat exchange through the fabrics of these suits, the EVA suit provides both liquid (conductive) and air (convective) cooling, while a liquid cooling garment is worn under the ACES in addition to a hose connection to forced orbiter cabin air. Thus, crewmembers with altered thermoregulatory capabilities are at even greater risk should failure of the cooling systems of these garments occur. Manifestations of altered thermoregulation include increased heart rate and body temperature during exercise, decreased work capacity and endurance, decreased postflight orthostatic tolerance, decreased cognitive ability, and a delay in recovery of exercise capacity and endurance after flight.

Thermoregulation has been studied in association with both spaceflight and 6° head-down-tilt bed rest. To date, there have been no direct measurements of heat balance during in-flight exercise sessions. In the only spaceflight study, submaximal exercise and thermoregulatory responses were recorded before flight and at 5 d after landing in two crewmembers who completed a 115-d mission. Normal heart rates were observed for both crewmembers during supine exercise for 20 min each at 20% and 65% of VO2max. However, during postflight (five days after landing) testing, exercise was voluntarily discontinued after only 8–9 min of supine exercise at the 65% of VO2max level for the two crewmembers when they both experienced difficulty in maintaining pedaling frequency and complained of leg fatigue, and their heart rates exceeded the highest recorded preflight levels. Both crewmembers exhibited a more rapid increase in body core temperature during the shorter postflight exercise session than during the preflight session; it was concluded that heat production was not altered but that impairment of heat dissipation due to altered vasodilatory and sweating responses were responsible for the increased rate of rise in the core body temperature.

Adequate energy (caloric) intake is a necessary requirement for humans living and working in space, and much attention has been focused on this requirement. Less effort has been spent on understanding how the caloric heat generated by energy expenditure is handled by humans whose physiologic responses to heat may be altered in the unique physical environment of spaceflight. Such studies should be considered at a higher level of priority for future human space missions. Recently applied models may be of use in providing a better understanding of the magnitude of this associated risk.

=== Experimental animal studies ===
This section summarizes the studies that have been conducted on animal subjects (such as rodents and non-human primates) that have been exposed either to spaceflight or (in the case of rodents) to the well accepted ground-based analog of hind-limb suspension (HS) to ascertain the effects of unloading states on the properties of muscle mass, strength, and endurance. The results presented herein overwhelmingly corroborate the body of evidence that has been reported on human subjects in the preceding sections of this report. Importantly, through the use of more cellular and molecular analyses, greater insights have been obtained into the underlying mechanisms associated with these alterations in muscle structure and function. Since the majority of evidence concerning the effects of spaceflight on mammalian skeletal muscle has been derived from rodent studies, the information provided here is focused mostly on the rodent model. It is important to point out that the structure and function of rodent skeletal muscle are nearly identical to those of human skeletal muscle. For example, rodent muscle is composed of the same general fiber-type profile and is sensitive to the same environmental (mechanical, hormonal, metabolic) cues observed for human muscle. Thus, the information summarized below provides credence to the data base derived from human subjects. However, it is important to point out that one primary advantage of the rodent model is that adaptive changes that occur in both species unfold in a much shorter time frame in rodents than in humans (hours to days versus days to weeks), making it possible to predict long-term changes in human skeletal muscle based on the shorter absolute time frame of the studies performed on rodents. Another important consideration in the context of animal research during spaceflight is that one can perform a straightforward experiment in which there is no requirement to provide some type of countermeasure intervention as there is for humans, and can thereby avoid the introduction of a confounding variable in ascertaining the true effects of spaceflight on a wide range of physiological variables. Also, given the remarkable agreement in the quantitative and qualitative nature of the findings observed in the spaceflight studies versus those obtained from ground-based HS studies, we have chosen to combine and integrate significant portions of the data that have been gathered in the last 25 years. This rodent data base in space life sciences research includes 14 flight experiments with 8 sponsored by the Russian Cosmos Program and 6 sponsored by NASA Space Life Sciences (SLS) and Space Transportation System (STS) missions. These flight experiments are complemented by numerous ground-based research studies that focused collectively on the topics described below. Most importantly, all of the data reported in this summary are derived from animal cohorts in which the control animals were studied from a synchronous vivarium group of the same age, strain, and gender, and the analyses were performed at the same time as that of the experimental groups. The provided information is based entirely on peer-reviewed experiments as detailed in the bibliography provided.

==== Activity patterns during spaceflight ====
While recorded observations during spaceflight are less extensive in rodents (due to fewer flight missions with opportunities for astronauts or payload specialists to observe them), the available data suggest that rodents rely less on the hindlimbs for executing most movement patterns (as is the case for humans). During spaceflight, their ankles appear to assume a plantar flexed position that may reduce the passive tension (force) imposed on the triceps surae group, of which the anti-gravity slow-twitch soleus muscle is a chief component. A similar posture has been observed in the ground-based analog of HS. This posture is thought to affect the residual tension placed on this muscle group in the absence of a normal weight-bearing state, that is, the ankle plantar flexor muscle group becomes truly unloaded. While electromyographic studies on adult rodents have not been conducted during spaceflight, studies performed on rodents during chronic HS indicate that only a transient reduction occurs in electrical activity of the ankle plantar flexor muscles (soleus and medial gastrocnemius). This pattern of activity is consistent with the posture of the muscle and the maintenance of muscle mass during the 28-day time frame of the experiment. That is, the EMG activity was well maintained, while the ongoing atrophy was maintained. These findings reinforce the notion that it is the mechanical activity rather than the electrical activity imposed on the muscle that is essential to maintaining physiological homeostasis.

==== Activity patterns in early recovery from spaceflight ====
When animals return from spaceflight of even short duration (days), their basic activity patterns are altered. The center of gravity in rats is much lower than normal. They no longer support their body weight and initiate movement off the balls of their feet, and the ankle joint assumes an exaggerated dorsiflexed position. Movement for most voluntary activities is much slower and more deliberate (the animals cover smaller distances per unit time), and the animals spend significantly less time in bipedal stances. Furthermore, the rodents use their tails for basic support to a greater degree, based on observations by the investigators. Thus, rodent motor skills and basic locomotor capability have less fidelity and capacity during posture maintenance and locomotion during the early stages of recovery; however, by 9 days after flight the activity properties return to those seen in normal conditions.

==== Effects of spaceflight and hindlimb suspension on muscle mass, protein content and gross morphological properties of skeletal muscle ====
Considerable information has accumulated covering a large number of spaceflight and HS experiments that span a time frame of ~4 to 22 days for spaceflight and from 1 to 56 days for HS. These experiments have primarily focused on extensor muscles used extensively for postural support and locomotor activity. The review by Roy, Baldwin, and Edgerton provides one of the most comprehensive reviews on rodents in the space environment. Additional reviews on this topic have been published. The collective observations clearly show that these types of muscle undergo significant reductions in muscle mass (muscle weight) along with a concomitant loss in total protein and myofibrillar (the fraction that is composed of the contractile machinery of structural proteins) protein content of the targeted muscles. In some experiments, it has been reported that the myofibrillar fraction can be degraded to a greater extent than other muscle fractions. The general pattern demonstrates that a rapid loss in muscle weight and net total and myofibrillar protein content (concentration (mg/g X muscle weight) occurs during the first 7–10 days of unloading and this is followed by a more gradual loss in these constituents. The net result is that between 25 and 46% of the muscle mass can be lost in antigravity muscles of the lower extremity such as the soleus (Sol; a calf muscle) and vastus intermedius (VI; a deep layered quadriceps muscle), which are composed mostly of the slow Type I myofibers containing the slow myosin heavy chain (MHC) protein. MHC is the most abundant protein expressed in striated muscle; and this structural / regulatory protein serves as the motor protein that regulates, in synergy with its companion protein actin, the contraction process that derives the force, work, and power generation that is necessary for the muscle groups to bring about both movement and stabilizing types of activity (posture). It is also important to point out that fast-twitch synergistic muscles (expressing fast isoforms of MHC) are also targeted, but these muscles and their fibers are apparently not as sensitive to the unloading stimulus as the slower types of muscle are. Compared to both the slow and fast types of muscle, atrophy of the corresponding joint flexors, for example the tibialis anterior and extensor digitorum longus muscles in the leg, is markedly less.

Histochemical and immunohistochemical analyses at the single-fiber level clearly show that the atrophic process seen at the gross level is due to a reduction in the diameter of the affected myofibers of which the individual muscles are composed. These observations show that the slow type of fiber is more sensitive than the faster types of fiber, which is consistent with the gross muscle mass determinations. As a rule, regardless of the muscle, the larger fibers, whether fast or slow, are more sensitive to the unloading stimulus than their smaller counterparts.

==== Muscle fiber phenotype remodeling in response to spaceflight and hind-limb suspension ====
Accompanying the atrophy process noted above are the important observations that many (but not all) of the slow fibers in primarily antigravity-type muscles (such as Soleus and VI) are also induced to express fast myosin isoforms. This transformation is largely manifested in the expression of hybrid fibers, in which both slow MHC and either fast type IIx or fast type IIa MHC become simultaneously co-expressed. These observations suggest that the slow MHC is targeted for degradation, evidenced by the net loss in slow MHC in the atrophying muscle (fibers), while at the same time, according to premRNA and mRNA analyses, up-regulation of the faster MHC genes by transcriptional and/or pretranslational processes occurs. More recent studies on this topic clearly suggest that the type IIx MHC, which is a faster isoform than the IIa type, is more abundantly expressed. From these observations it is apparent that the myofibrillar fraction, which is a key component of the muscle, is targeted for net degradation (as noted above) for two reasons:

1. degradation of this fraction allows smaller-diameter fibers to become manifest to meet the reduced requirements for force generation, and
2. the unraveling of the myofibrillar system allows faster MHC isoforms to become incorporated into the contractile machinery to replace the slower ones so that the muscle is able to function more effectively under a reduced state of gravitational loading.

Providing further insight is the observation that the unloading state of spaceflight and of HS also increases the expression of fast type II sarcoplasmic reticulum (SR) ATPase-driven calcium pumps (SERCA II) while repressing the slower type I SERCA calcium pump. Since calcium cycling is used to regulate fiber activation and relaxation, the SR component of the muscle fiber controls the synchrony of contraction-relaxation processes. Since calcium cycling and crossbridge cycling are the two major systems that account for the vast majority of the energy expended during muscle contraction to support movement, when this property of the muscle is switched to a faster system the muscle can function more effectively in the unloaded environment. However, when the muscle encounters environments with a high gravitational stimulus, the faster properties are inherently less economical in opposing gravity and thus the muscle fibers become more fatigable when contracting against a load for long durations.

==== Metabolic processes ====
In contrast to the contractile apparatus, studies on various rodent skeletal muscle metabolic enzymes have revealed a variety of responses with no clear-cut adaptive changes in oxidative enzyme expression. These observations are consistent with the results of studies focusing on mitochondrial function after 9 days of spaceflight in which no reduction in the capacity of skeletal muscle mitochondria to metabolize pyruvate (a carbohydrate derivative) was observed. These analyses were carried out under state 3 metabolic conditions, that is, non-limiting amounts of substrate and cofactors to simulate an energy turnover demand similar to that of high-intensity exercise. However, when a fatty acid substrate was tested, a reduction in the capacity of different muscle types to oxidize the long-chain fatty acid, palmitate, was observed. This latter finding is in agreement with the observation that muscles exposed to spaceflight increase the level of stored lipid within their myofibers. Additionally, use of the metabolic pathway for glucose uptake is increased in muscles undergoing HS. Thus, while the enzyme data are equivocal, it appears that in response to states of unloading, some shift in substrate preference may occur whereby carbohydrates are preferentially utilized based on utilization capability. If this is indeed the case, it could result in a greater tendency for muscle fatigue, should the carbohydrate stores become limited during prolonged bouts of EVA activity.

==== Functional correlates to the alterations in muscle mass and contractile phenotype in response to spaceflight ====
Stevens and associates reported that in isolated single-fiber analyses, deficits in force generation capacity were found along with a reduced sensitivity to calcium stimulation. Similar observations occurred for both slow and fast ankle extensor fibers after 14 days of spaceflight. This study focused on the force-generating aspects of muscle fibers. It appears that only two additional studies have been conducted to examine the effects of spaceflight on rodent skeletal muscle functional properties using a more comprehensive set of analyses. One project was carried out for 6 days while the other involved a 2-week flight (SLS-2). In both studies, the measurements focused on the force-velocity properties, which define the limits of functional capacity of the muscle. These studies were conducted on the soleus skeletal muscle, in which slow-twitch myofibers predominate, because of the dynamic changes in fiber morphology and phenotype that were observed in the other studies summarized above. Analyses on the animals were initiated within 6 hours of return from spaceflight. The findings showed that the maximal strength of the muscle, as studied in situ using a computer-programmed ergometer system, was reduced by 24% after the 6-day flight and 37% after the 14-day flight. These changes were consistent with the degree of atrophy observed at both the gross and single-myofiber level. Also, shifts occurred in the force-frequency response of the soleus in the flight animals, suggesting a switch to a faster contractile phenotype. Maximal shortening velocities were increased by 14% and 24% in the 6-day and 14-day spaceflight groups, respectively. These intrinsic increases in shortening speed were attributed, in part, to the de novo expression of the fast type IIx MHC in many of the slow muscle fibers. On the other hand, both work- and power-generating capacities of the flight-induced atrophied muscles were significantly decreased. Additionally, the resistance to fatigue was significantly decreased as well as the ability to sustain work and power output in response to a paradigm involving repetitive contraction output. Similar findings have been observed using comparable analytical approaches involving the HS model. Taken together, the findings clearly indicate that when skeletal muscles, especially those having a large proportion of slow myofibers, undergo both atrophy and remodeling of the contractile phenotype, the functional capacity of the muscle is reduced along with its ability to sustain work output. If a sufficient mass of muscle tissue across several key muscle groups were similarly affected, this would most likely impair the fitness of the individual when challenged with moderate-intensity exercise scenarios.

==== Are atrophied muscles vulnerable to injury ====
Riley and associates have provided an excellent synopsis of the structural integrity of mammalian muscle during the early stages after return from spaceflight. Their findings suggest that in atrophied slow types of skeletal muscle, there is no evidence of fiber damage when the muscles are taken from animals euthanized and processed during spaceflight. However, observations suggest that during the first 5–6 hours after spaceflight (the earliest time point at which the animals can be accessed), edema occurs in the target anti-gravity muscles such as the soleus and the adductor longus (AL). This is thought to occur by increased blood flow to the muscles when they become initially reloaded in opposition to gravity. In addition, in certain regions of the AL, there is some indication of fiber damage based on histological analyses of the myofibril integrity and protein alignment in the sarcomere. While these observations were noted in ~2.5% of the fibers of the AL, they were not present in the soleus. Riley has proposed that the reason for the differential response between the two muscle groups is that weakened animals have altered their posture and gait so that eccentric stress is placed on the AL, resulting in some fiber damage. Edema and fiber damage were not noted in another cohort of animals studied 9 days after landing. However, in additional studies performed on both spaceflight and HS rodents in which 12 to 48 hours were allowed to pass before the muscles were analyzed, observations indicated that the normal cage activity induced significant lesions in the muscles after sufficient reambulation was allowed. These included eccentric-like lesioned sarcomeres, myofibrillar disruptions, edema, and evidence of macrophage activation and monocyte infiltration (known markers of injury-repair processes in the muscle) within target myofibers.

The inference of these findings is that there is indeed a propensity for muscle injury secondary to the atrophic process that weakens the muscle, and given the instability of the animal after spaceflight as described above, there is most likely a potential for injury if stressful stimuli are imposed on the muscle system before it can regain its proper structural and functional capability.

==== Cellular and molecular mechanisms of muscle atrophy in response to unloading stimuli ====
As presented above, skeletal muscle atrophy involves an imbalance between the processes that control protein synthesis (also known as protein translation) and those that control protein breakdown. When the two processes are in synchrony, muscle mass is stable. However, if there is an imbalance such that the protein synthetic pathway is decreased relative to that of the rate of degradation, muscle atrophy will occur. In the case of skeletal muscle atrophy in response to spaceflight or HS, a decrease in the capacity for synthesis as well as an increase in the processes that regulate degradation seem to occur, creating a rapid net degradation response to the unloading stimulus. On the basis of the available information, such a scenario is thought to involve the following chain of events. At the onset of unloading involving a wide range of models including spaceflight, a decrease in transcriptional and/or pre-translational activity occurs in skeletal muscle that affects the type I and IIa MHC genes as well as the actin gene. This results in a reduced level of both pre-mRNA and mRNA pools (the latter being a substrate for protein translation) for these three proteins. Together, MHC and actin provide the bulk of the myofibril fraction that accounts for most of the protein in the muscle cell. Concomitantly, a decrease occurs in the activity of key protein kinase enzyme systems (constituting the PI3kinase/akt/mTOR pathway), which regulates the protein synthetic apparatus controlling protein translation. This alteration, in combination with a smaller amount of mRNA substrate, collectively contributes to a reduction in the net capacity for protein synthesis. Occurring simultaneously with this process is the up-regulation of a set of genes that encode proteins that play a regulatory role in augmenting protein degradation. These include the myostatin gene, the atrogin 1 gene, and a gene called muscle ring finger protein (MURF). Myostatin is an antigrowth transcription factor, which is thought to negatively modulate the genes that promote growth. Atrogin and MURF are E3 ligases that are responsible for ubiquinating target proteins to mark them for degradation in a system designated as the proteasome. This MURF protein has been reported to be a key regulator for specifically targeting breakdown of the type I and type IIa MHC proteins.

As a result of the reduction in net capacity for protein synthesis and the augmentation of protein degradation, a net loss of muscle protein in the muscle fiber occurs along with a change in the relative proportion of the MHC protein content, since available findings show that the faster MHC genes are up-regulated during muscle atrophy. Hence, this results in a smaller, faster muscle phenotype, which is apparently more suitable for muscle performance in states of unloading. The chain of events described above must be blunted or reversed if the muscle is to perform optimally when faced with an increased gravitational stimulus in returning to Earth or transitioning from low gravity (microgravity) to higher gravitational environments such as landing on the Moon or Mars. It is apparent that the best strategy to accomplish this task is via a vigorous countermeasure program that provides a high level of mechanical stress to prevent the imbalance in protein expression that occurs when the muscle is insufficiently loaded for significant periods without an intervening anabolic stimulus.

==== Effects of spaceflight on non-human primates ====
The only other species besides the rat that has been involved in spaceflight studies on skeletal muscle is the rhesus monkey. Two monkeys were flown in space for 14 days on the Bion 11 satellite. They were compared to ground-based vivarium control animals as well as a chair-restricted group that involved immobilization of the upper arm and shoulder. The results from these studies provided the following insights. Individual fibers (slow and fast) of the monkey displayed functional properties that were more closely aligned to those of human fibers than to those of rodents, in that the fibers were larger but less powerful per unit cross-sectional area than rodent fibers. However, in pre- and postflight analyses of single fibers, slow fibers in both the slow-twitch soleus and triceps muscles underwent greater atrophy and reductions in force and power production than fast-twitch fibers. Also, transformations in the myosin heavy chain profile indicated that there was a greater level of hybrid slow/fast fibers in the two different muscle groups. Immobilization of the triceps muscle group produced similar responses, but the magnitude of change was much less than that in the spaceflight animals.

Additional experiments performed on these same animals, involving locomotor activity before and after spaceflight via muscle electromagnetic and tendon force recordings, respectively, demonstrated that postural and locomotor control was compromised by spaceflight as has been observed in humans. These alterations were chiefly manifested in modified load-related cues as reflected in the altered relative recruitment bias of flexor muscles versus extensors and fast versus slow motor unit pools. In an additional flight study (Cosmos Flight 2229) involving two rhesus monkeys, EMG recordings were obtained before, during, and after spaceflight. These experiments were unique in that recordings obtained during spaceflight revealed a preferential shift in recruitment patterns favoring the fast medial gastrocnemius versus its synergistic slow soleus muscle, that is, the normal recruitment pattern was reversed; and this alteration was maintained well into the recovery stage after spaceflight, further suggesting a reorganization of the neuromotor system during and immediately after exposure to microgravity.

Thus, it is apparent that skeletal muscle fibers of humans, monkeys, and rodents share similar patterns of myofiber alterations that, in the case of monkeys and humans, are also linked to altered motor performance in response to different states of unloading, reduced usage, and return to an Earth gravitational environment.

== Computer-based simulation information ==
In 2007 a report was published about an effort to develop a computer-based simulation named "The Digital Astronaut" to predict the loss of skeletal muscle mass and function in a microgravity environment or to predict the efficacy of countermeasures in experimental animals or humans. The Digital Astronaut was described as "an integrated, modular modeling and database system that will support space biomedical research and operations, enabling the identification and meaningful interpretation of the medical and physiological research required for human space exploration, and determining the effectiveness of specific individual human countermeasures in reducing risk and meeting health and performance goals on challenging exploration missions". Because of the difficulties in developing such a mathematical model based on the complexities and variables of human physiology operating in the unusual environment of microgravity, the utility of this approach, although reasonable, remains to be proven.

== Future exploration missions ==
The risks related to loss of skeletal muscle mass, strength, and endurance depends not only on the level of loss but also on the starting point and the relative physiologic expense required to successfully complete a requisite set of tasks within a fixed period. Thus, a crewmember must be capable of completing a task before being exposed to microgravity, the amount of functional loss cannot be allowed to fall below the level needed to successfully complete all assigned tasks, and the physical performance requirements for completion of the tasks should be known. Without information relating to the physical performance requirements of tasks, it is not possible to determine the risk of failure.

Additionally, if a task could not be completed by a crewmember before microgravity exposure, it can reasonably be stated that the risk of failure during a mission is 100%. However, even if a crewmember has the capability to complete every possible task, a composite of the tasks to be completed over a finite period presents an entirely different requirement because it might be possible to select a composite of tasks to be completed within a work period that exceeds the capabilities of a single crewmember or perhaps every crewmember. Additionally, all possible contingencies that might arise must be considered, so that a crewmember will be able to deal with such off-nominal scenarios even near the end of a duty day. Thus, even an approach as basic as thoughtful scheduling of daily tasks could serve to help mitigate risk.

From the above discussion, several important items emerge that must be known with respect to the risks related to loss of skeletal muscle mass, strength, and endurance. These include:

- Baseline level of crewmember functional performance (strength, endurance, level of functional performance, etc.)
- Magnitude of functional loss from baseline at any point during the mission
- Physiological demand of a task or set of tasks to be completed
- The time period in which the tasks should be performed
- All possible contingency events that could affect functional performance
- Any other interfering conditions that could affect functional performance (such as nutritional and psychological status, EVA suit specifications, equipment malfunction or failure, illness, injury, etc.)

An indication of the importance of individual baseline performance is obtained from an illustrative example from the EDOMP program. Losses in trunk flexor and extensor strength were greater for the crewmembers who exercised on the Shuttle treadmill during flight than for the crewmembers who did not exercise during their mission (see Figure 6-7). Although at first this seems counterintuitive, simple logic provides the explanation. Crewmembers who chose to exercise during flight did so because they exercised regularly as part of their daily routine before flight. Since they were at a higher level of fitness than their non-exercising crewmember cohorts, they lost more strength during flight. However, what cannot be ascertained from % change data are absolute strength levels. For instance, exercising crewmembers who lost twice as much abdominal and back muscle strength as their non-exercising counterparts could still have greater strength in those muscles if they started off three times stronger than their non-exercising colleagues.

=== Lunar sortie missions ===
With respect to future missions involving humans, lunar sortie missions will probably represent the lowest risk of the currently planned missions and will likely be no greater in risk than the Apollo missions (at least with respect to skeletal muscle performance) unless unusual surface operations are planned that differ markedly from Apollo lunar surface operations. The longest cumulative time of lunar surface EVA by a crew during the Apollo Program was about 22 hours. (combined from 3 separate days) and the longest total duration of the crew on the lunar surface was about 75 hours during the sixth and final Apollo mission (Apollo 17).

The answer to the question of whether exercise equipment should be available to crewmembers for short missions to the Moon and back is actually an easy one and the answer is a resounding "Yes." During some of the Apollo missions, a small, lightweight device called the "Exer-Genie", which required no external power, was made available to crewmembers (see Figure 6-1) and they were encouraged to use it. Specific comments from the Apollo crewmembers collected during the recent "Apollo Summit" are particularly relevant and can be summarized as follows:

- Exercise is not necessary on a short trip and crews did not feel that they suffered noticeable deconditioning, but they did demand that exercise capability be available as much as possible for "rest and relaxation" for ALL phases of the mission. The exercise device was used by all crewmembers with varying amounts and intensities. Lunar surface crews (maximum time spent on surface operations [EVAs] was 22 hours during a 75-hour stay for Apollo 17) felt that their activities on the lunar surface provided enough exercise for a short-duration mission but would have welcomed a simple, robust device for stretching and forearm exercise. (Note: The Exer-Genie remained on the Command Module with the Command Module Pilot; it did not accompany the two astronauts who descended to the lunar surface in the lunar excursion module.)
- Apollo crewmembers felt that crew surgeons and mission planners should not hard-schedule exercise prescriptions for such short-duration missions but allow the crew to perform them at their leisure.
- They stated that a more robust and lightweight piece of in-flight exercise equipment is needed than flown during Apollo. The Exer-Genie was limited, its ropes were friable, and the device generated a lot of heat and smell, so an alternative exercise device is needed.
- Most crewmembers felt that the pre-mission timeline should provide adequate time to maintain musculoskeletal strength and stamina. Some astronauts attributed their capabilities on the lunar surface to pre-mission training because in some cases more force was needed on the lunar surface while wearing the EVA suit than was needed in 1G on Earth.
- The crew felt that Exer-Genie or an alternative was definitely needed, and because of a fear that they would break it, they actually tapered off from intense use to save it for use in reconditioning on the return trip before re-entry.
- The strongest comment was that "as many exercise capabilities as possible should be built into all future vehicles" because they will get used and the crew further felt that exercise capability throughout flight was critical and that a variety of exercises should be provided.

=== Lunar outpost missions ===
Lunar outpost missions will present a greater challenge than shorter "sortie" missions, but with respect to the current risk topic they probably represent risks similar to those experienced on the ISS. Lunar gravity, although about 1/6 that of Earth gravity, is still more conducive to providing sufficient loading to maintain muscle mass and function than is microgravity. Certainly exercise regimens and hardware will be required, not only for countering muscle atrophy but for the reasons stated by Apollo astronauts above as well. How much exercise is needed and the proper way to implement it are certainly knowledge gaps that will require innovative research to fill. Part of this research will unquestionably help to define the level of risks to which crews will be exposed but will also be helpful in properly mitigating those risks.

=== Mars transit ===
Transport between Earth and Mars may represent the greatest risk to humans in the history of human spaceflight. Apart from the risks of radiation exposure, deterioration of the musculoskeletal system has to be prevented or a round-trip mission to Mars cannot be successful. This requires highly refined exercise protocols and robust exercise equipment to monitor functional capacity for mitigation of the risks inherent in long-term exposure to microgravity. Challenges include fitting these within the current design of the crew exploration vehicle (CEV), which provides trivial space for equipment and crew. The cramped confines afford little room for stretching or exercise. There is little to no power for anything other than a human life support system, and so the design is marginal to support a full complement of exercise by efficiently dealing with the byproducts of heat, water vapor, and carbon dioxide.

=== Mars outpost ===
Knowledge gained during lunar outpost missions will be highly relevant to successful establishment of a Martian outpost. If the challenges posed by the long transit to Mars and the extended period of microgravity exposure can be met, the outpost phase should represent a much lower risk by comparison, since lunar outpost experience will have allowed significant opportunity to develop risk-mitigation strategies for this phase. The gravitational environments are similar; in fact, the Martian gravity field, being greater than that of the Moon, will provide a less formidable setting. However, capability to provide sufficient exercise capacity during the Martian outpost phase is essential in preparing the crew for a long-duration exposure to microgravity on the transit back to Earth. This probably represents the greatest challenge with respect to maintaining a safe level of skeletal muscle performance for exploration-class missions.

== Current gaps ==
Despite four decades of effort, success in prevention of spaceflight muscle atrophy and skeletal muscle functional deficits has not yet been achieved in every case although progress has been made. Gaps in our knowledge have prevented us from implementing a countermeasures program that will fully mitigate the risks of losing muscle mass, function, and endurance during exposure to the microgravity of spaceflight, particularly during long-duration missions. There are also gaps in our knowledge about working and living in partial-G environments and the effect that wearing an EVA suit has on human performance in such an environment.

=== In microgravity ===
The major knowledge gaps that must be addressed by future research to mitigate this risk of loss of skeletal muscle mass, function, and endurance include the following:

- For humans living in a microgravity environment, the optimal exercise regimen, including the modes, intensity, and volume needed to minimize or fully mitigate risk, is not known. An appropriate exercise prescription must be developed and validated during spaceflight.
- The types and functional requirements of exercise hardware and the most comfortable human-to-hardware interfaces needed to minimize or fully mitigate risks is not known. Such hardware is likely to be mission-specific and should be validated in the appropriate environment.
- The effect on maintenance of skeletal muscle strength by in-flight use of the currently developed advanced Resistive Exercise Device (aRED) is not known. Because of the inherent shortcomings in the interim device (iRED) (maximum achievable load ~300 lbs), we have not provided an optimal resistance exercise opportunity for flight crews. An in-flight study utilizing aRED is essential in determining the efficacy of a program of combined aerobic and resistive exercise during long-duration microgravity exposure.
- The expected composite of mission-specific critical mission tasks and their physiologic costs to crewmembers during surface EVA operations is not well defined. This is essential to determining human functional requirements and attendant risks. The level of skeletal muscle loading and aerobic exercise provided by surface EVA on the Moon must be determined either through modeling or by lunar analog studies and then validated.
- For humans living in partial G environments, the optimal exercise regimens, including the modes, intensity, and volume needed to minimize risk, are not known. Appropriate exercise prescriptions must be developed and validated for partial G environments.
- EVA suits are known to reduce the effective maximum forces that can be generated by crewmembers for task completion so that a portion of the crewmember's work expenditure is lost in the resistance inherent to the suit. Suited human performance levels when working in partial G environments are not known and represent an additional knowledge gap that must be filled by conduct of appropriate research.

=== In analog environments ===
- To develop the needed exercise regimens needed for different mission scenarios, analog environments will be necessary. The appropriate analog environments for optimizing mission-specific exercise prescriptions and exercise hardware are not yet well defined.
- Initially, a lunar analog environment will be necessary to determine if activities of daily life in combination with anticipated surface EVA activities will protect skeletal muscle function. The outcome of this study will determine what additional modes, intensities, and volumes of exercise will be needed to maintain skeletal muscle function in a lunar partial G environment.
- The results of lunar analog studies will be invaluable for the design and planning of a Martian outpost mission.

=== Exploration mission operational scenarios ===
A mission to Mars or another body within the Solar System is not beyond possibility within the next two decades. Extended transit times to and from distant planetary bodies within the context of current CEV designs represents a challenge to the life sciences community. Knowledge drawn from research during long-duration microgravity exposure on the ISS will be beneficial in mitigating risks to humans during this phase. Many gaps in our current knowledge about living and working for long periods on planetary surfaces in partial G environments should be filled during lunar outpost missions.

== See also ==
- Space Medicine – Loss of Muscle Mass
- Weightlessness – Human health effects
- Effect of spaceflight on the human body
- William E. Thornton – NASA Experience
- ISS
- Spacelab
- Skylab
- Mir
