= Advanced Resistive Exercise Device =

Exercise device for exercise in zero gravity

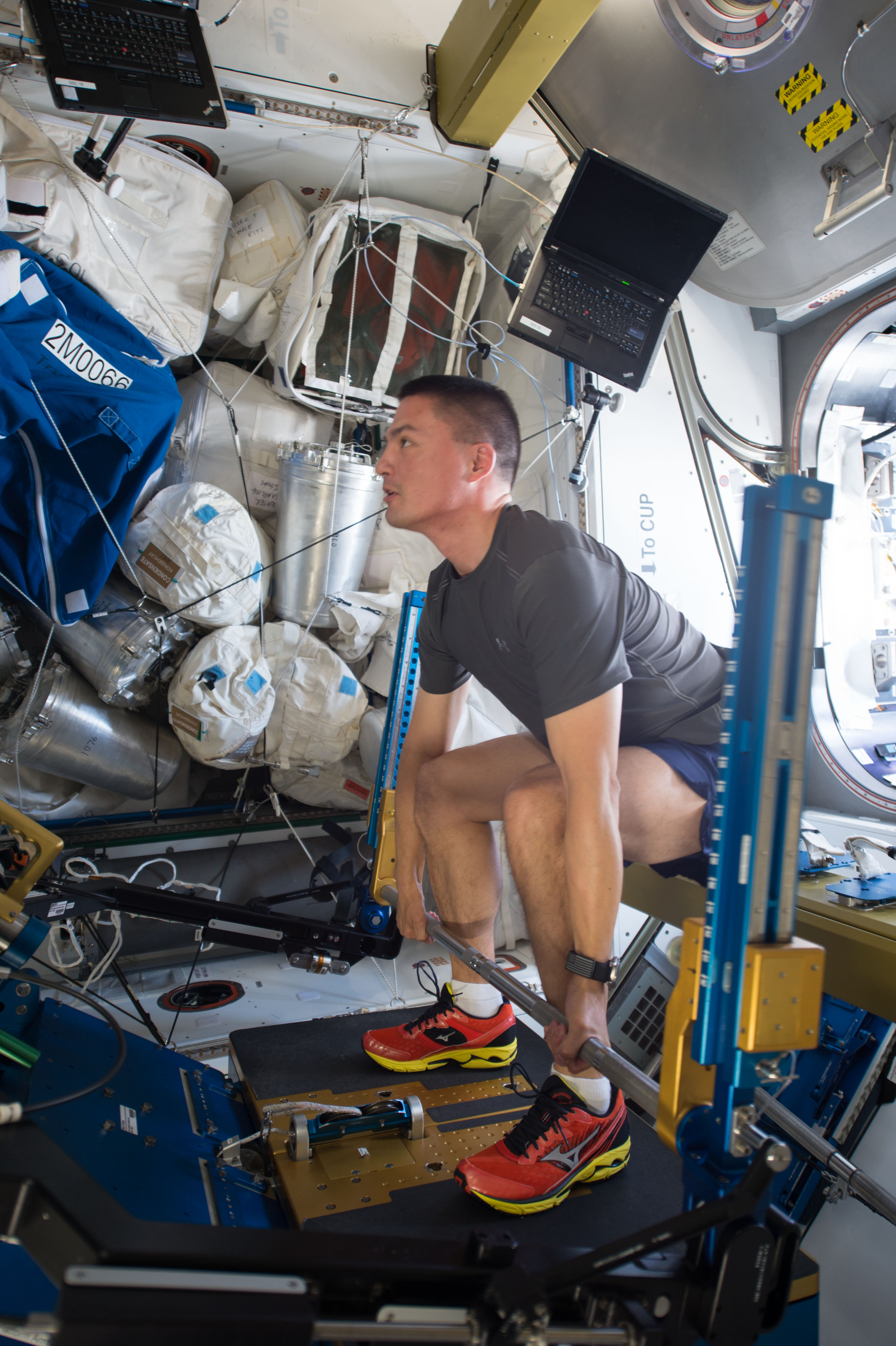
Astronaut Kjell Lindgren exercises using the ARED

The Advanced Resistive Exercise Device (ARED) is an exercise device designed by NASA to allowed for more intense workouts in zero gravity. The device was flown to the International Space Station during STS-126 and installed in 2009 to replace its inefficient predecessor, the Interim Resistance Exercise Device. The device uses a system of vacuum tubes and flywheel cables to simulate the process of free weight exercises, such as squats, deadlifts, and calf raises, workouts which more effectively prevent lower muscle atrophy, though it has the capability to workout any muscle group. The ARED device can accommodate all astronauts on the ISS.

Astronauts can lose approximately 15% overall muscle mass throughout a long mission and up to 30% of their lower-body muscle mass. The reason for the change from iRED is that the ARED can deliver up to 600 pounds-force (2,700 N), double that of the iRED. Specifically, the ARED can support 600 lbf (2,700 N) for bar workouts and 150 lbf (670 N) for cable workouts.

The device works through the use of two mechanisms:

1. Pistons inside of the vacuum tube moving within to create resistance. The piston rods are attached to the arm base as a lever.
2. The cable-powered flywheel assembly. This mimics the force of free weights.

== See also ==
- Flywheel training
- Orion flywheel exercise device
