= Change of direction =

Change of direction (COD) is any activity that involves a rapid whole-body movement with a pre-planned change of velocity or direction.

In elite sports, the speed at which an athlete can do a change of direction is especially valuable in court and field sports. Strength and conditioning coaches in such sports program various exercises to train their athletes in this regard.

== See also ==
- Agility
- Flywheel training
