= Isoinertial =

Isoinertial denotes a type of resistance used in exercise training which maintains a constant inertia throughout the range of motion, facilitating a constant resistance and maximal muscle force in every angle.

The term isoinertial derives from the words iso (same) and inertial (resistance), which in one terminology describes the primary concept of the isoinertial system, or expressing the same inertia in both the concentric and the eccentric phases of muscle contraction.

== The Origins ==
Since the late 1980s, during long-duration space travel, was placed as a problem as the ability to maintain power the muscles of astronauts engaged in missions, given that the absence of gravity led to an environment in which they experienced atrophy of the musculoskeletal system, no longer called to support the load of the body weight, as well as a reduction in bone mineral density. Studies and research carried out about a solution that led to the strengthening of muscles of astronauts and subsequently, over the years, has become a method of muscle training very useful for preservation, prevention and rehabilitation. In practice it was created a flywheel training system for resistance training with a belt and a flywheel that, driven by the belt, controlling a process which generated movement regardless of the strength of gravity.

== The Isoinertial Method ==
The isoinertial's muscle activity follows the muscular action of the sporting gesture or rather what the body or parts of it are in duty to perform in sports, according to which, in strength and speed variable, an inertial load (such as a ball), a limb or the body itself (such as when accelerating or changing direction) the athlete is forced to respond at the level coordinative motor and neuromuscular very quickly to situations and motor gestures sudden and not predetermined.

== The Benefits ==
The great utility of the isoinertial method and at the same time what makes it different from the normal isotonic muscle movement lies in the fact that the action isotonic developed in conventional exercises (strength machines and free weights), the resistance is constant throughout the whole of movement in both the concentric phase in which the eccentric, which is equivalent to the set load. In the isoinertial method the resistance is adapted in every moment and is proportional to the force developed in the sense that the greater the force expressed by the subject in the concentric phase, the greater will be the acceleration with which the flywheel reacts.
