= Bed rest =

Medical treatment involving resting in bed

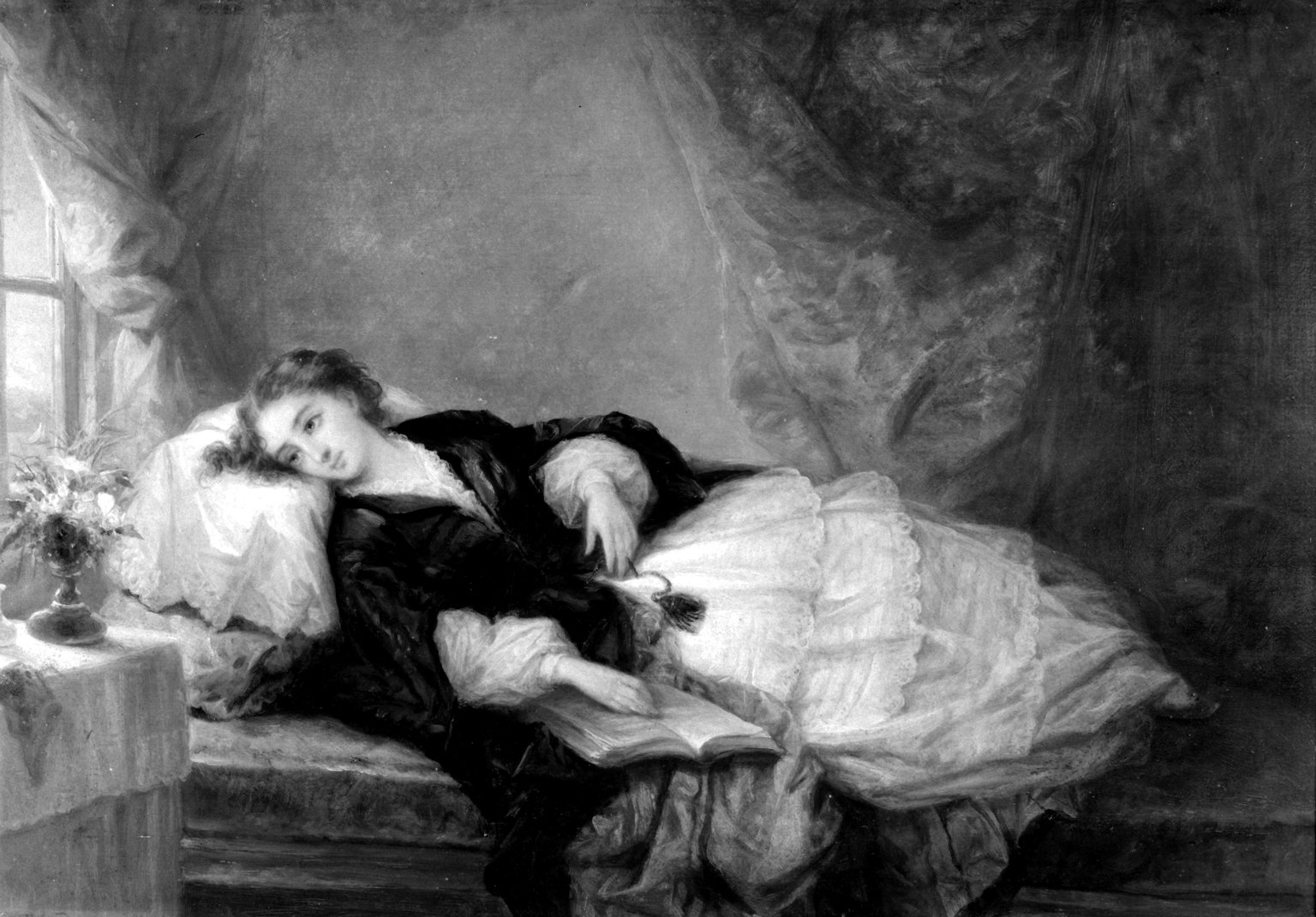
- The Invalid (c. 1870), painting by Louis Lang in the Brooklyn Museum
- Other names: cessation, expiration, halt, shutdown, stoppage surcease, and termination

Bed rest, also referred to as the rest-cure, is a medical treatment in which a person lies in bed for most of the time to try to cure an illness. Bed rest refers to voluntarily lying in bed as a treatment and not being confined to bed because of a health impairment which physically prevents leaving bed. The practice is still used although a 1999 systematic review found no benefits for any of the 17 conditions studied and no proven benefit for any conditions at all, beyond that imposed by symptoms.

In the United States, nearly 20% of pregnant women have some degree of restricted activity prescribed despite the growing data showing it to be dangerous, causing some experts to call its use "unethical".

== Medical uses ==
Some studies suggest extended bed rest can be harmful and requires more careful evaluation.

=== Pregnancy ===
Women who are pregnant and are experiencing early labor, vaginal bleeding, and cervix complications have been prescribed bed rest. This practice in 2013 was strongly discouraged due to no evidence of benefit and evidence of potential harm.

Evidence is unclear if it affects the risk of preterm birth and due to potential side effects the practice is not routinely recommended. It is also not recommended for routine use in pregnant women with high blood pressure or to prevent miscarriage.

Women pregnant with twins or higher-order multiples are at higher risk for pregnancy complications. Routine bed rest in twin pregnancies (bed rest in the absence of complications) does not improve outcomes. Bed rest is therefore not recommended routinely in those with a multiple pregnancy.

Use in combination with assisted reproductive technology such as embryo transfer is also not recommended.

=== Back pain ===
For people with back pain bed rest has previously been recommended. Bed rest, however, is less beneficial than staying active. As a treatment for low back pain, bed rest should not be used for more than 48 hours.

=== Other ===
- As of 2016 it is unclear if bed rest is useful for people in wheelchairs who have pressure ulcers.
- Bed rest may be sufficient treatment for mild cases of Sydenham chorea.
- In those with deep vein thrombosis early movement rather than bed rest appears helpful.

== Adverse effects ==
Prolonged bed rest has long been known to have deleterious physiological effects, such as muscle atrophy and other forms of deconditioning such as arterial constriction. Besides lack of physical exercise it was shown that another important factor is that the hydrostatic pressure (caused by gravity) acts anomalously, resulting in altered distribution of body fluids. In other words, when getting up, this can cause an orthostatic hypertension, potentially inducing a vasovagal response.

Additionally, prolonged bed rest can lead to the formation of skin pressure ulcers. Even physical exercise in bed fails to address certain adverse effects.

Phlebothrombosis is marked by the formation of a clot in a vein without prior inflammation of the wall of the vein. It is associated with prolonged bed rest, surgery, pregnancy, and other conditions in which blood flow becomes sluggish or the blood coagulates more readily than normal. The affected area, usually the leg, may become swollen and tender. The primary danger is that the clot may become dislodged and travel to the lungs. (a pulmonary embolism).

== Technique ==
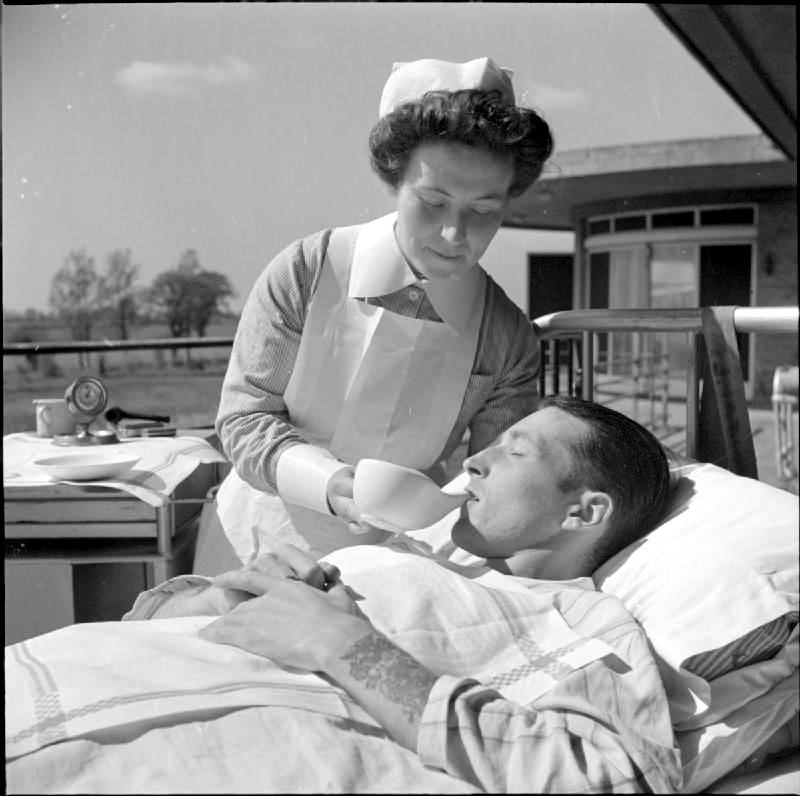
This man in 1945 England has been prescribed complete bed rest and accepts assistance so as not to sit up to drink.

Complete bed rest refers to restricting a person from sitting up for any reason, including daily activities like drinking water.

Placing the head of a bed lower than the foot is sometimes used as a means of simulating the physiology of spaceflight.

== History ==
As a treatment, bed rest is mentioned in the earliest medical writings. The rest cure, or bed rest cure, was a 19th-century treatment for many mental disorders, particularly hysteria. "Taking to bed" and becoming an "invalid" for an indefinite period was a culturally accepted response to some of the adversities of life. Melville Arnott noted the increased use of bed rest in late-19th and early-20th century medical practice:

It has, of course always been recognised that rest is essential for the acutely ill person [...]. But there is little mention of bed rest in the 18th and early 19th century by such authors as Withering, Heberden, and Stokes. [...] The mid-19th century saw the impact of Hilton's Rest and Pain [...]. In one case after another Hilton scored success, after all sorts of fantastic treatments had failed, because he recognised the value of rest in inflammation - particularly in osteomylitis and bone and joint tuberculosis which was then so prevalent. As so often happens, opinion swung to the opposite extreme, and rest came to be regarded as the universal healer. [...] Another reason for undue emphasis on bed rest may be the tendency, since the 19th century, to treat illness in hospital, rather than at home. In most hospitals, even today, the patient is expected to be in bed: the whole organisation is geared to such a state, and there is little provision for the up patient. [...] Furthermore, the routine of the bed bath and the bedpan is firmly established in nursing care. Indeed, many of our older hospitals - especially those for the chronic sick, with large inadequately heated wards and too few nurses - enforce bed rest as the only modus operandi.

In addition to bed rest, patients were secluded from all family contact to reduce dependence on others. The only person whom bed-rest patients were allowed to see was the nurse who massaged, bathed, and clothed them. Not only were patients isolated in bed for an extended time, they were advised to avoid other activities that might mentally exhaust them - such as writing or drawing.

In some extreme cases electrotherapy was prescribed. The food the patient was served usually consisted of fatty dairy products to revitalize the body. This "rest cure" along with its name were created by Dr. Silas Weir Mitchell (1829–1914), and it was almost always prescribed to women, many of whom were suffering from depression, especially postpartum depression.

Before the advent of effective antihypertension medications, bed rest was a standard treatment for markedly high blood pressure. It is still used in cases of carditis secondary to rheumatic fever. Its popularity and perceived efficacy have varied greatly over the centuries.

In 1892, feminist writer Charlotte Perkins Gilman published "The Yellow Wallpaper", a horror short-story based on her experience when placed under the rest cure by Dr. Silas W. Mitchell himself. She wasn't allowed to write in a journal, paint a picture, or release her imagination in any way, though she was artistically inclined. If she ever felt ill, she was simply told to return to bed. Her specific instructions from Dr. Mitchell were to "Live as domestic a life as possible. Have your child with you all the time... Lie down an hour after each meal. Have but two hours' intellectual life a day. And never touch pen, brush or pencil as long as you live." Gilman abided by Mitchell's instructions for several months before practically losing control of her sanity.

Eventually, Gilman divorced her husband and pursued a life as a writer and women's rights activist. She later explained in her 1935 autobiography The Living of Charlotte Perkins Gilman that she could not be restrained to the domestic lifestyle without losing her sanity, and that "it was not a choice between going and staying, but between going, sane, and staying, insane."

The narrator in "The Yellow Wallpaper" reflected her own authentic account. The narrator was advised by her husband to perform the rest cure and avoid creative activities while struggling with fits of depression. After becoming obsessed with the yellow wallpaper in her room, the narrator suffers a mental breakdown and frees a "woman behind the wall", metaphorically resembling Gilman's own mental break and release from female expectations. Gilman sent her short story to Dr. Mitchell, hoping that he might change his treatment of women with mental health and help save people from her own experience. The story became a symbol of feminism in the 1970s at the time of its rediscovery.

The author Virginia Woolf was prescribed the rest cure, which she parodied in her novel Mrs Dalloway (1925) with the description "you invoke proportion; order rest in bed; rest in solitude; silence and rest; rest without friends, without books, without messages; six months rest; until a man who went in weighing seven stone six comes out weighing twelve".

Some negative effects of bed rest were historically attributed to drugs taken in bed rest.

== See also ==
- Bedridden
- Postpartum confinement, the period after giving birth
- Lying-in, the historic term for enforced rest after giving birth
- Reduced muscle mass, strength and performance in space
