= Flywheel training =

Type of strength training

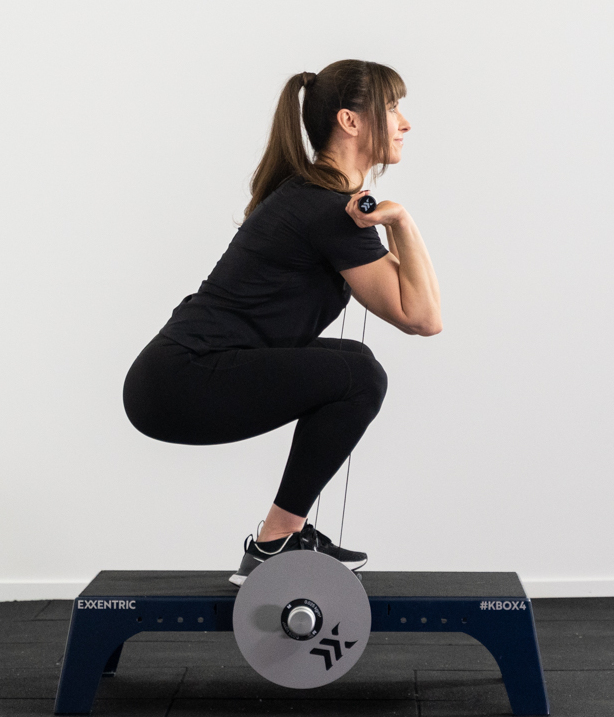
A "thruster" exercise performed on a kBox flywheel training device.

Flywheel training is a method of strength training where the resistance required for muscle activation is generated by the inertia of a flywheel instead of gravity, as in traditional weight training.

In contrast to weight training, flywheel training offers variable resistance throughout the range of motion, which facilitates isoinertial training and eccentric overload. Flywheel training is shown to lead to improvements of strength and power, hypertrophy, muscle activation, muscle length, and tendon stiffness. This in turn can improve athletic performance in speed, jump height, change of direction and resilience to injury.

== History ==
An early scientific research paper on flywheel training was conducted by researchers Hansen and Lindhard at the University of Copenhagen in 1924 and looked at the maximum realizable work of the elbow flexors.

After that, flywheel resistance training was studied in space travelers exposed to microgravity environments to fight the effects of sarcopenia and bone mineral density loss, started at Karolinska Institute in the 1990s funded by NASA and ESA. Since then, flywheel training has been studied in different populations like youth and professional athletes, as well as older adults.

Current evidence suggests that flywheel training-based training is superior to gravity-based training for increasing muscle strength, power, and hypertrophy.

== See also ==
- kBox
- Orion flywheel exercise device
