= Treadmill with Vibration Isolation Stabilization =

Treadmill aboard the International Space Station

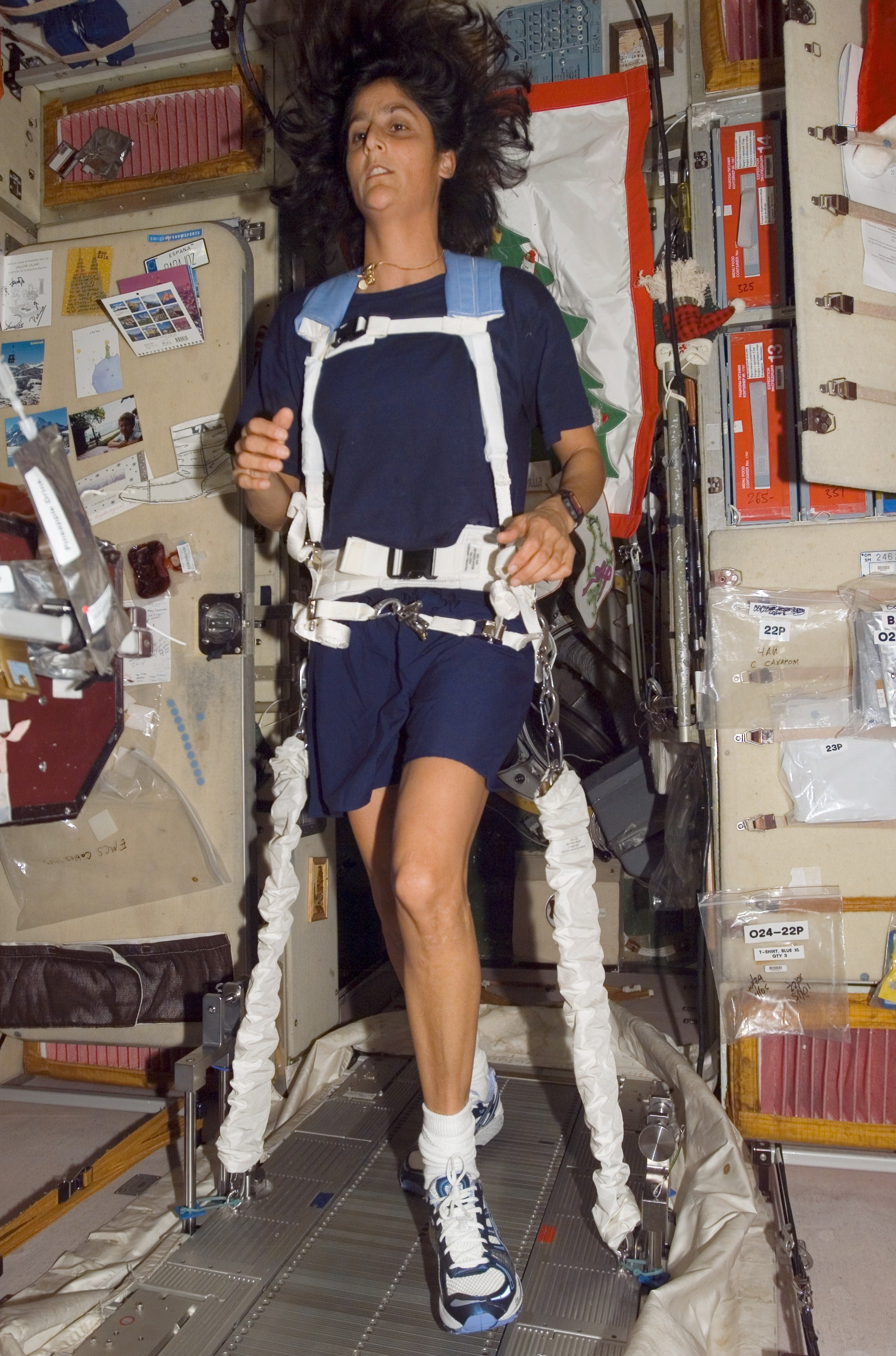
Astronaut Sunita "Suni" Williams bungeed to the TVIS treadmill aboard the International Space Station

The Treadmill with Vibration Isolation Stabilization System, commonly abbreviated as TVIS, is a treadmill for use on board the International Space Station and is designed to allow astronauts to run without vibrating delicate microgravity science experiments in adjacent labs. International Space Station treadmills, not necessarily described here, have included the original treadmill, the original TVIS, the BD-2 (БД-2), the Combined Operational Load-Bearing External Resistance Treadmill (COLBERT), and the Treadmill 2 (abbreviated as T2). Some share a name, some a design, some a function, some use different (passive) vibration-suppression systems, some it is unclear how they differ. However, the original TVIS was created as what NASA calls a Detailed Test Objective (DTO) unit, and it was not meant to support the 6 member crew of the ISS. Therefore, T2 was created as a rugged system that could be used every day by the crew.

The name for the treadmill (COLBERT) came about due to a naming contest that NASA held for what became the Tranquility module. Comedian and TV personality Stephen Colbert used his show The Colbert Report to encourage his viewers to write in votes to use "Colbert" during the contest. After the results of the contest were announced, NASA decided to use Colbert's name for the new treadmill in place of naming the Tranquility module after him.

== Exercise ==
Following the advent of space stations that can be inhabited for long periods of time, exposure to weightlessness has been demonstrated to have some deleterious effects on human health. Humans are well-adapted to the physical conditions at the surface of the Earth. In response to an extended period of weightlessness, various physiological systems begin to change and atrophy. Though these changes are usually temporary, long-term health issues can result.

The most common problem experienced by humans in the initial hours of weightlessness is known as space adaptation syndrome or SAS, commonly referred to as space sickness. Symptoms of SAS include nausea and vomiting, vertigo, headaches, lethargy, and overall malaise. The first case of SAS was reported by cosmonaut Gherman Titov in 1961. Since then, up to 75% of all people who have flown in space have suffered from this condition. The duration of space sickness varies, but in no case has it lasted for more than 72 hours, after which the body adjusts to the new environment.

The most significant adverse effects of long-term weightlessness are muscle atrophy and deterioration of the skeleton, or spaceflight osteopenia. These effects can be minimized through a regimen of exercise. Other significant effects include fluid redistribution, a slowing of the cardiovascular system, decreased production of red blood cells, balance disorders, and a weakening of the immune system. Lesser symptoms include loss of body mass, nasal congestion, sleep disturbance, excess flatulence, and puffiness of the face. These effects begin to reverse quickly upon return to the Earth.

To prevent some of the effects associated with weightlessness, a treadmill with vibration isolation and stabilization designed for the International Space Station (ISS) was first evaluated during STS-81. Three crew members ran and walked on the device, which floats freely in the micro-gravity experienced during orbit. For the majority of the more than 2 hours of locomotion studied, the treadmill operated well, and vibration transmitted to the vehicle was within the micro-gravity allocation limits that are defined for the ISS. Refinements to the treadmill and harness system, which ultimately led to development of the COLBERT model, were studied after this first flight. One goal of the treadmill design is to offer the possibility of generating 1 g-like loads on the lower extremities while preserving the micro-gravity environment of the ISS for structural safety and vibration free experimental conditions.

The treadmills are intended to help astronauts stay fit, fighting off the bone loss (spaceflight osteopenia) and muscle decay that otherwise comes with space travel. Astronauts use bungee cords to strap themselves to the treadmill in order to remain in contact with the equipment while in micro-gravity. Researchers believe that exercise is a good countermeasure for the bone and muscle density loss that occurs when humans live for a long time without gravity.

== Maintenance ==
The original Treadmill with Vibration Isolation Stabilization (TVIS) that was recessed into the floor of the Zvezda Service Module was decommissioned in June 2013, disposed of on the Russian Progress (50P) in July 2013 and replaced by the Russian БД-2.

Expedition 20 flight engineers Michael Barratt and Koichi Wakata have performed a complete overhaul of that treadmill to extend its life. Both treadmills will continue to be used, which will nearly double the availability of these critical work-out devices for space station crews.

Treadmill with Vibration Isolation Stabilization system (TVIS) also required repair in 2002, during Expedition 5 while STS-112 was docked. Valery Korzun spent an entire day performing maintenance on the unit.

A design flaw with the COLBERT power system was discovered in September 2010, within 10 months of being commissioned. A multiple day IFM was required in October in order to remove COLBERT from its rack and replace key power components. A power utility box was designed for T2 maintenance at the same time T2 was designed. It was delivered when T2 was delivered to be used for troubleshooting.

== Naming COLBERT ==
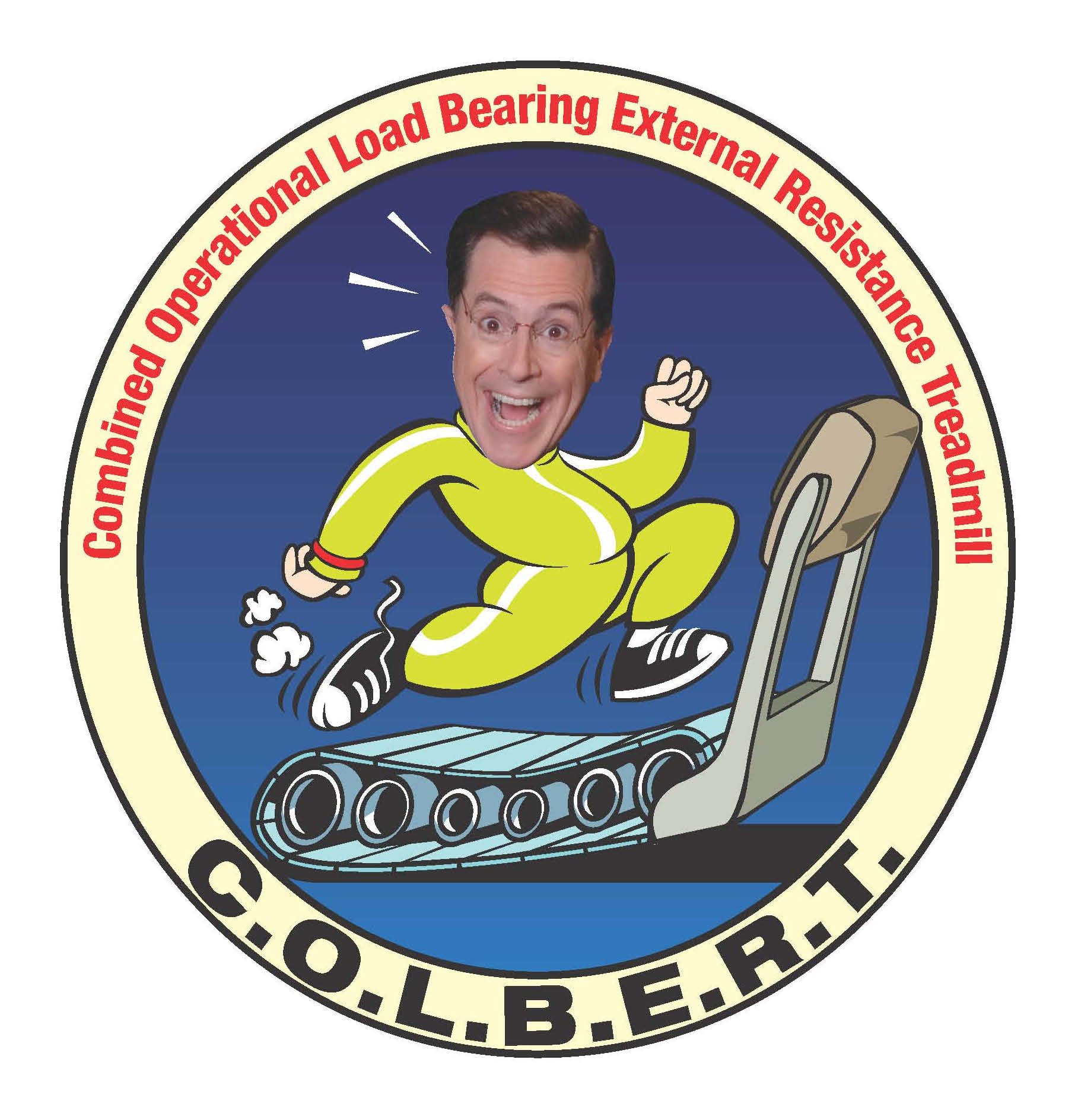
Official patch for COLBERT

In early 2009, NASA held an online poll to name what became the Tranquility module. On the 3 March 2009 episode of The Colbert Report, host Stephen Colbert instructed his viewers to suggest "Colbert" as the name for Node 3 in the online poll. On 23 March 2009, it was announced that "Colbert" had garnered the most votes, but NASA did not immediately commit to using the name.

Congressman Chaka Fattah had pledged to use congressional power to ensure that democratic voting is honored in outer space as well as on planet Earth, in response to the possibility that NASA would overrule the voting. On the 14 April 2009 episode of The Colbert Report, astronaut Sunita Williams appeared on the show to announce that NASA decided to name the node 3 "Tranquility", the eighth most popular response in the census, and announced that they would name a new treadmill on the station after the comedian – Combined Operational Load-Bearing External Resistance Treadmill (COLBERT). Colbert was invited to Houston to test the treadmill, and later to Florida for its launch. The treadmill was taken to the ISS in August 2009, aboard STS-128 and was installed in the Tranquility module after the node arrived at the station in February 2010.

NASA poked fun at itself in a humorous press release included in the STS-128 flight day 6 execute package report which claimed that Jon Stewart demanded to be honored similarly but turned down the agency's offer to name the ISS Urine Processor "Space Toilet Environmental Waste Accumulator/Recycling Thingy" (STEWART).

== Development ==
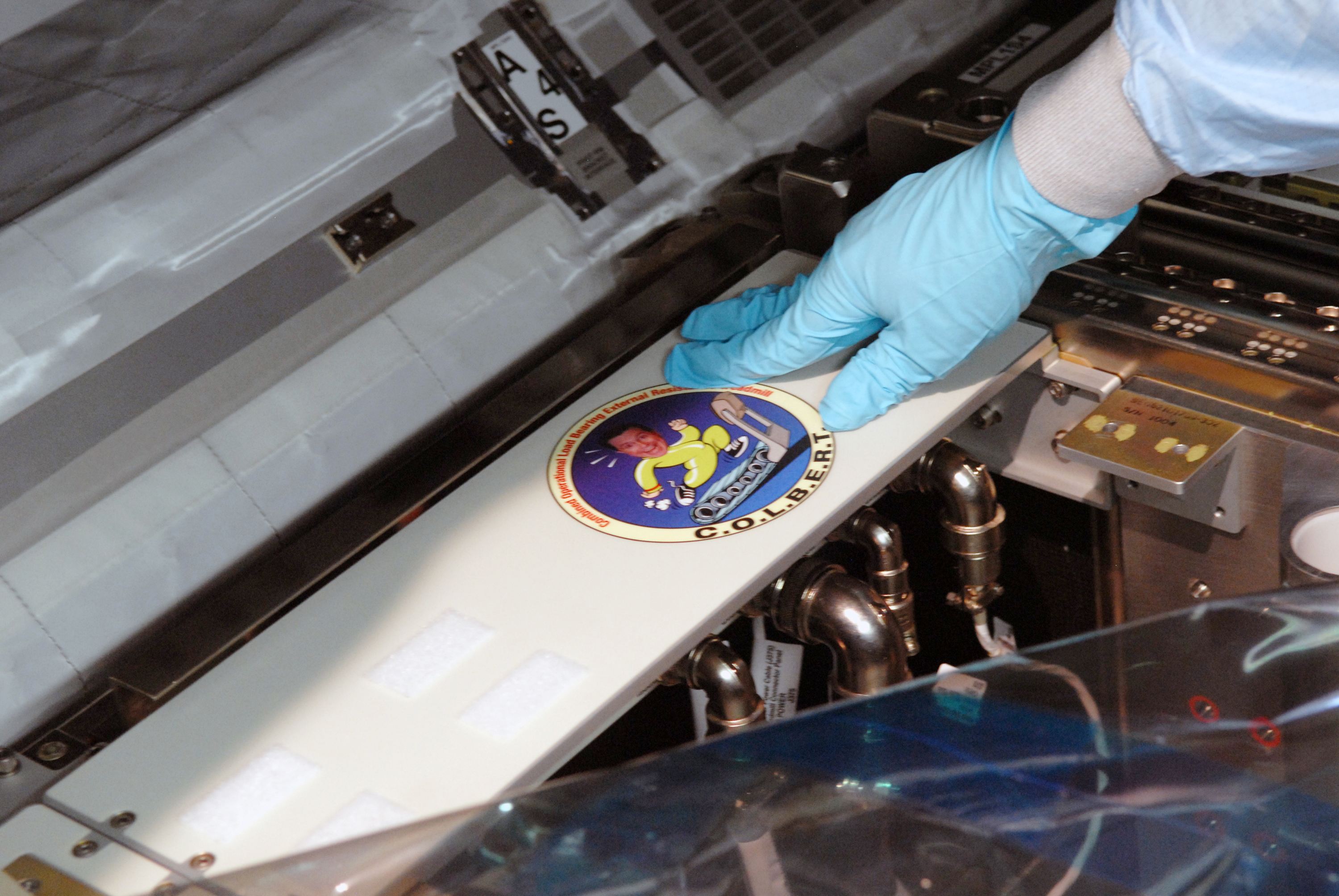
The COLBERT decal being placed during construction

NASA Engineers started development with a Woodway medical treadmill design which is available to anyone on Earth, and they asked Woodway to nickel plate the parts and make some other modifications, but it is fundamentally the same running-in-place device as the commercially available model. The structures which support the treadmill have been adapted for use in space. Without gravity to hold the runner to the surface of the treadmill, designers added elastic straps that fit around the shoulders and waist in order to keep the runner from rocketing across the space station with the first hard step. Designers also had to work out a way to keep the treadmill from shaking the whole station with every step. Preventing vibrations is relatively easy to do on Earth, but the station is floating just like the astronauts are, and it wants to react against any movement that is made inside of it. Even small actions can shake up delicate microgravity experiments taking place inside the station's laboratories. Developing a system to stop the vibrations was the biggest challenge, Wiederhoeft said.

The first station treadmill, which was brought to the Space Station aboard STS-98, relied on a powered system of gyroscopes and mechanisms to reduce vibrations. COLBERT's Vibration Isolation System was designed to work without power, and also to be more reliable than its predecessor. COLBERT will rest on springs that are hooked to dampers, which are then connected to a standard-sized rack that has been extensively reinforced in order to handle the power produced by COLBERT users. The rack alone weighs 2,200 pounds, which is its contractual design limit, and is also louder than the first treadmill which is a trade-off Wiederhoeft said is necessary to increase its reliability. "Noise and reliability are fighting against each other here," Wiederhoeft said. "With a lot more time we could have had both quiet and reliable. We went for reliable, and did what we could with noise."

Development of the treadmills was also utilized in order to further development of commercial products. Possible secondary effects of development include improved vibration and acoustic isolation applications in sensitive equipment such as equipment used in optical, microelectronic and precision manufacturing.

== COLBERT delivery ==
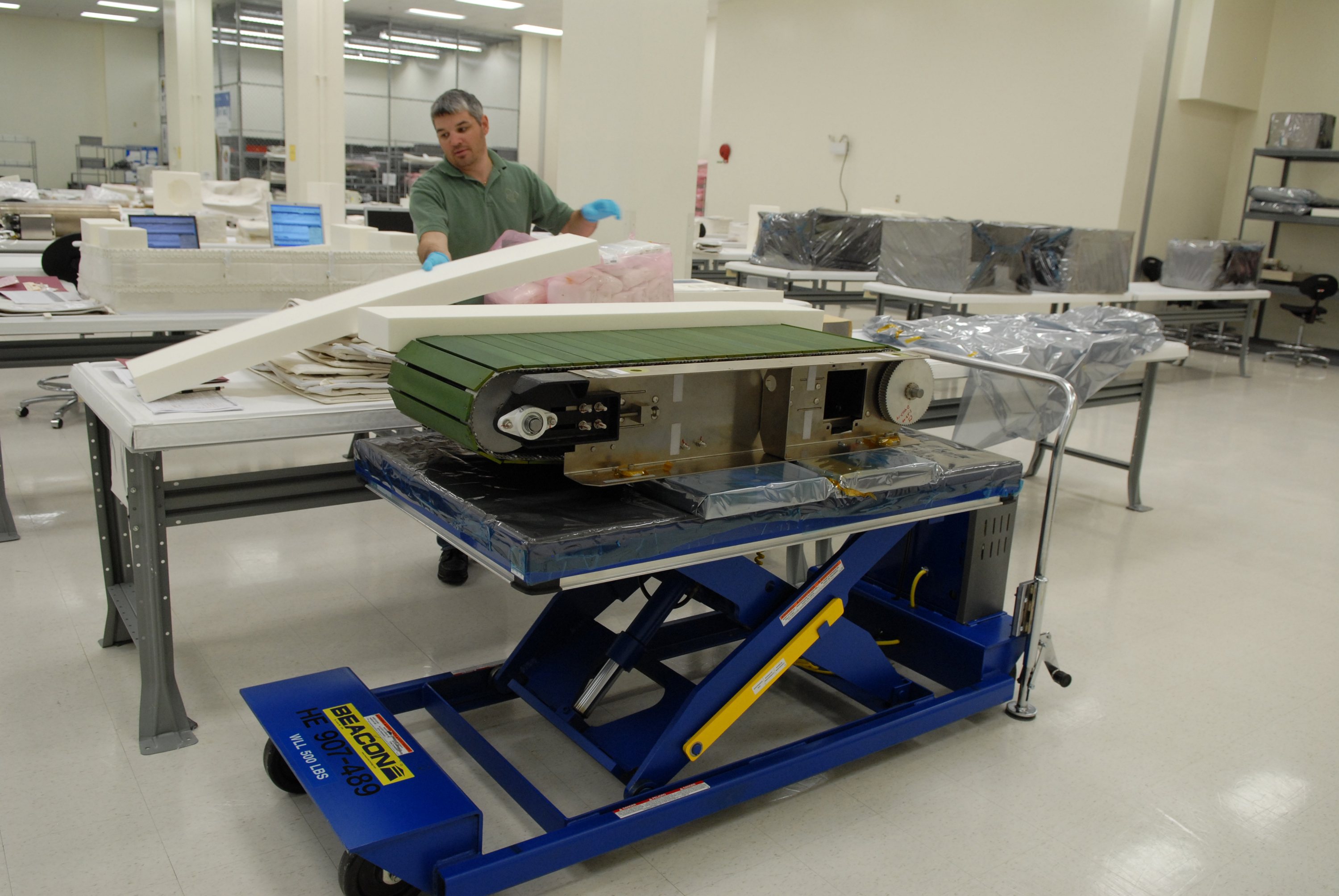
Pete Gauthier, a packing engineer for United Space Alliance, prepares the COLBERT and its parts for loading into the Multi-Purpose Logistics Module Leonardo in preparation for launch to the International Space Station.

A team of engineers was required in order to prepare COLBERT to survive the rigorous vibrations of the launch process. COLBERT had to be disassembled into scores of parts, separated into more than six bags and strapped to racks inside the Leonardo cargo module, which flew to the International Space Station aboard STS-128. COLBERT was delivered to the Space Station in 2010, and resided first inside the Harmony module, before later being moved to the Tranquility module.

The packing team set out to make sure everything that is launched reaches the station in good working order. "If it's the COLBERT, or if it's something else, it's still not going to be useful in orbit if it's broken," said Pete Gauthier, packing engineer for United Space Alliance. "The difference with something like this is that it's big and it's heavy, so we have to use our biggest bag," he said. "It's easier for the crew if you have all the pieces in one bag, but when you have six bags, you just can't do that." The astronauts on the station are expected to spend about 20 hours putting the whole thing together, including the vibration system. After assembly, the only care COLBERT should need is an occasional greasing of its bearings.

== See also ==
- Orion flywheel exercise device
