= Orion flywheel exercise device =

Compact exercise device used aboard NASA's Orion spacecraft

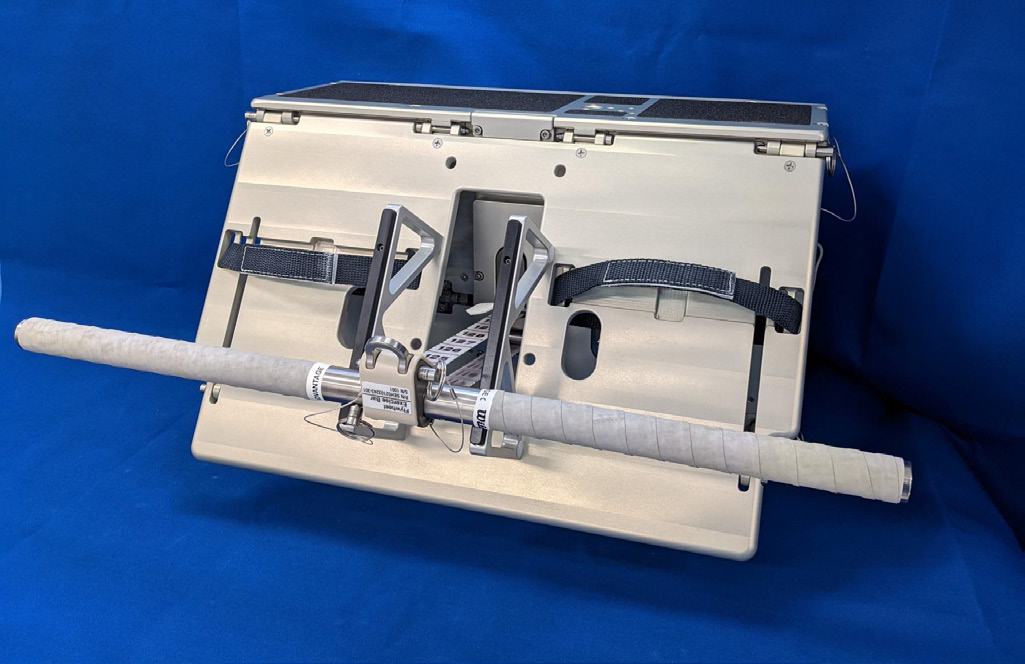
The Orion flywheel exercise device

The Orion flywheel exercise device (or Artemis Flywheel Exercise Device, FWED) is a compact, belt-driven flywheel-based exercise system developed for use aboard the Orion crew module as part of NASA's Artemis program. The device supports both aerobic and resistance exercise using a flywheel and cable mechanism to generate resistance proportional to user input, allowing movements such as rowing, squats, and deadlifts.

Earlier NASA spacecraft did not include dedicated exercise devices. Research conducted aboard the International Space Station has shown the importance of exercise during spaceflight, including on relatively short-duration missions. The device supports a range of physical activities on a spacecraft such as Orion, where large-scale exercise equipment is impractical due to volume and mass constraints.

== Design and operation ==
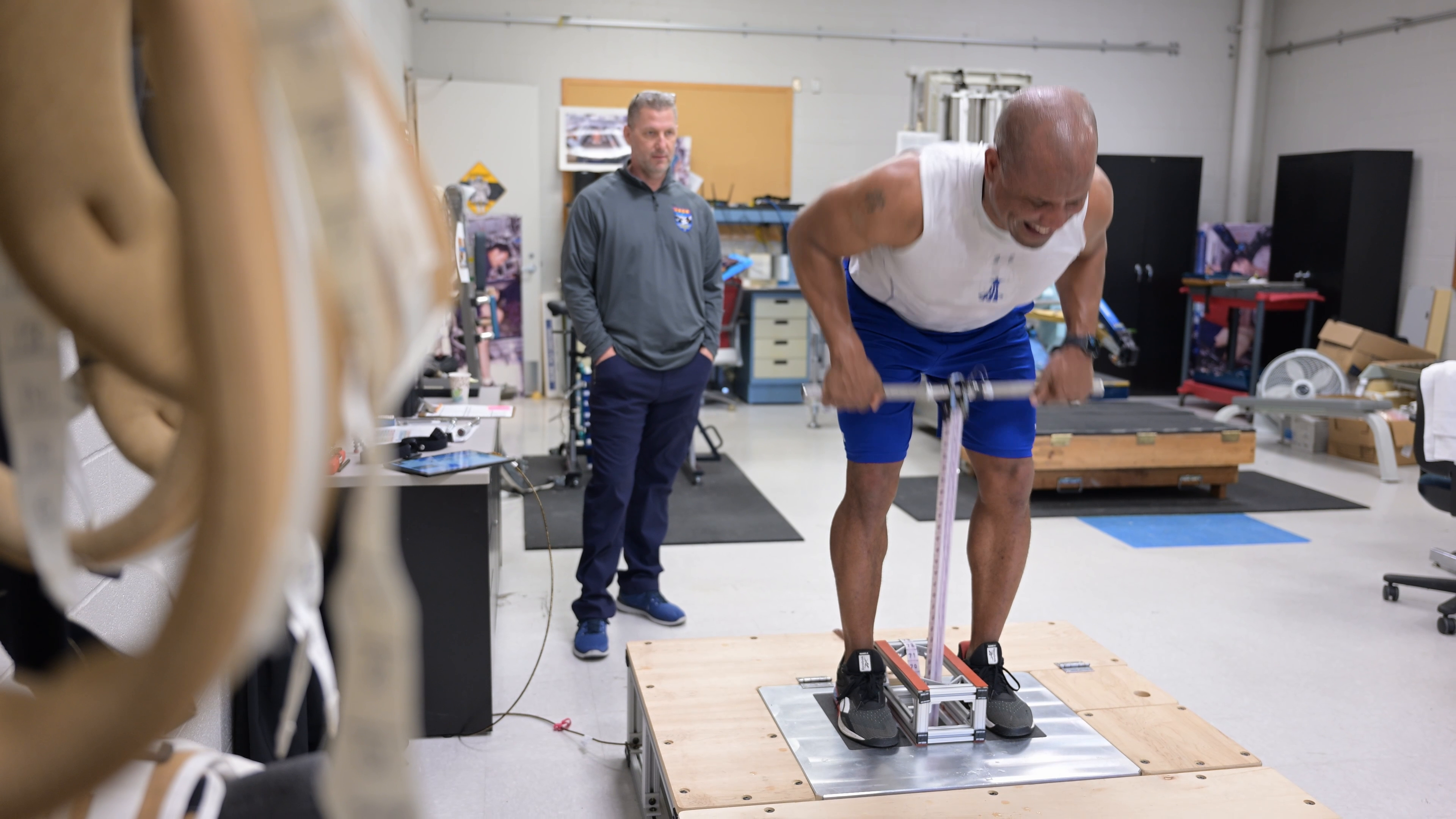
Artemis II pilot Victor Glover testing the Orion flywheel exercise device

The device uses a cable-driven flywheel to provide resistance for exercise. When an astronaut pulls the cable, kinetic energy is stored in the rotating flywheel and returned as resistance as the cable rewinds, enabling strength training without the need for traditional weights. This approach, related to inertial training, allows the system to function effectively in microgravity while minimizing mass and structural requirements.

Similar flywheel-based exercise concepts have been explored in terrestrial systems such as the kBox, which also uses inertial resistance principles.

Resistance can be adjusted through selectable settings and by the amount of force applied by the user. The system includes three resistance levels which alter the mechanical advantage of the flywheel. The effective load varies depending on user input, with maximum resistance reaching approximately 400–500 pounds (180–230 kg), enabling a range of exercises suited to different crew members. The footplate, bar, and harness are stowed during launch and re-entry. The flywheel assembly is mounted below the side hatch, where it also serves as a step for crew ingress and egress.

== Development ==
The Orion flywheel exercise device was developed under NASA's human spaceflight research and crew systems programs as part of efforts to create compact resistance training for missions beyond low Earth orbit. According to reporting on the Artemis II mission, the device was specifically designed to address the constraints of the Orion spacecraft, where traditional large-scale exercise equipment used on the International Space Station is not feasible.

Development focused on reducing mass and volume while maintaining sufficient resistance capability for exploration missions. Testing of the system has included ground-based evaluations and microgravity simulations to assess performance, usability, and integration with spacecraft systems.

== Operational use ==
The device was first used during the crewed Artemis II mission, where astronauts performed exercise sessions on all mission days except on launch and landing day. Each crew member was scheduled to use the system for approximately 30 minutes per day, with additional time allotted for setup, data collection, and recovery.

During these operations, ground teams monitored the effects of crew activity on the spacecraft’s Environmental Control and Life Support System and overall vehicle dynamics. For Artemis II, the flywheel device was instrumented with accelerometers to measure forces transmitted to the spacecraft structure, while video and other data were collected to evaluate system performance and crew interaction.

The inclusion of the device reflects the need for exercise even on relatively short-duration missions, where large-scale equipment is impractical.

== See also ==
- Effect of spaceflight on the human body
- Treadmill with Vibration Isolation Stabilization
