= Hong Kong cuisine =

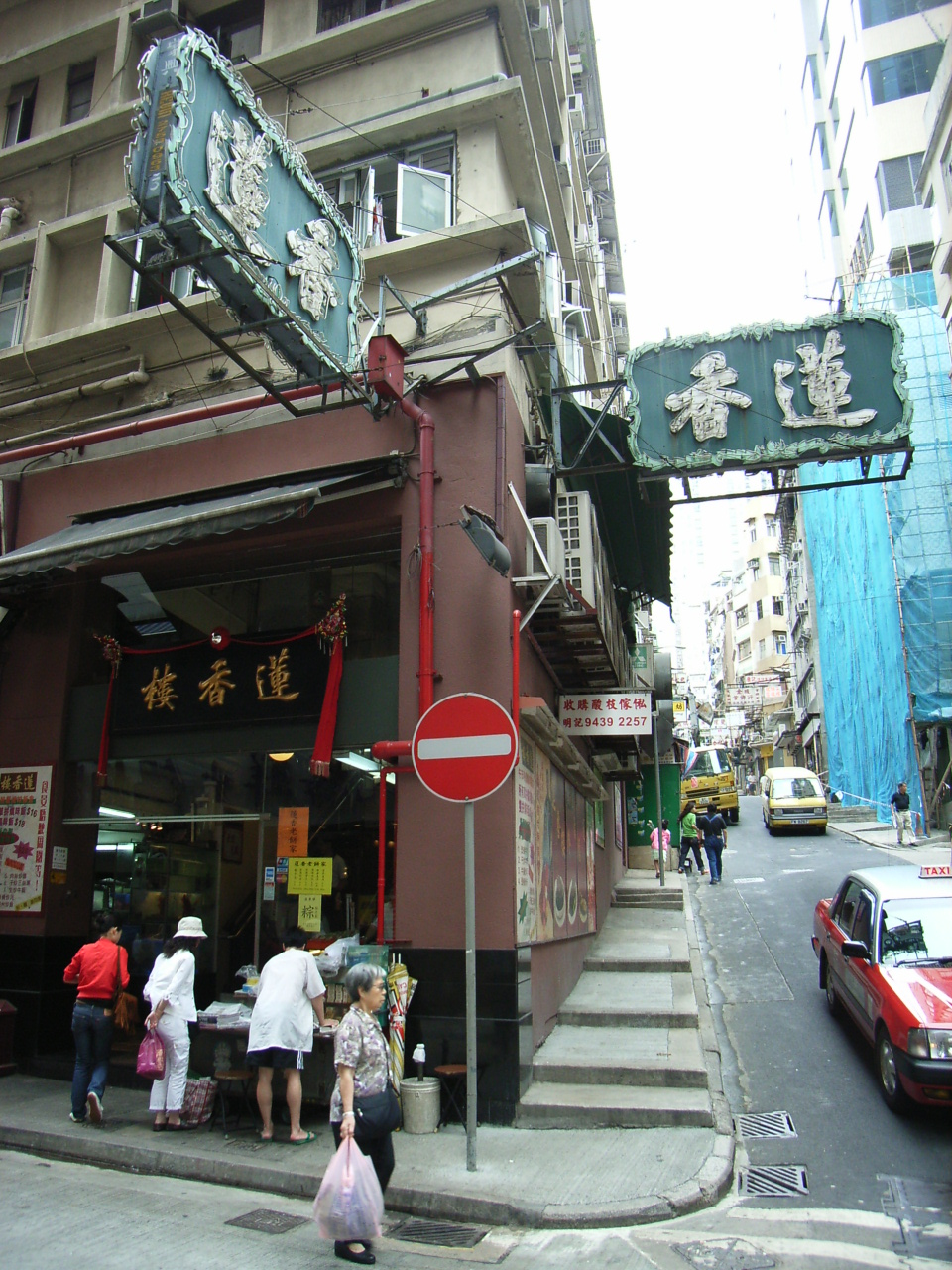
Lin Heung Tea House in Hong Kong

Hong Kong cuisine is mainly influenced by Cantonese cuisine, European cuisines (especially British cuisine) and non-Cantonese Chinese cuisines (especially Hakka, Teochew, Hokkien and Shanghainese), as well as Japanese, Korean and Southeast Asian cuisines, due to Hong Kong's past as a British colony and a long history of being an international port of commerce. Complex combinations and international gourmet expertise have given Hong Kong the labels of "Gourmet Paradise" and "World's Fair of Food".

== Background ==
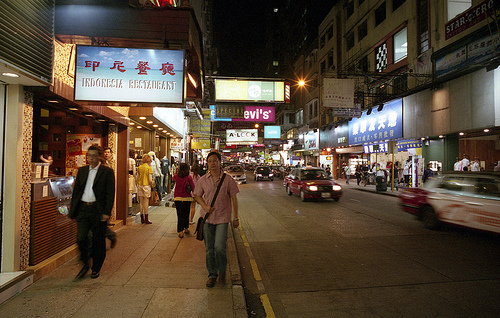
Tsim Sha Tsui, a major food district in Hong Kong

Modern Hong Kong has a predominantly service-based economy, and restaurant businesses serve as a main economic contributor. With the fourth-densest population per square metre in the world and serving a population of 7 million, Hong Kong is host to a restaurant industry with intense competition. Due to its small geographical size, Hong Kong contains a high number of restaurants per unit area.

With Cantonese ethnicity making up 92% of the resident population, dishes served at home were likely Cantonese cuisines. A majority of Chinese in Hong Kong are Cantonese in addition to sizable numbers of Hakka, Teochew and Shanghainese peoples, and home dishes are Cantonese with occasional mixes of the other three types of cuisines. Cantonese cuisine laid the foundations of Hong-Kong cuisine by being the dominant cuisine for the working-class throughout the 19th to early 20th century.

Rice is predominantly the main staple for home meals. Home ingredients are picked up from local grocery stores and independent produce shops, although supermarkets have become progressively more popular. Supermarkets dominated in the 2000s with 59% share in fruit retail, 52% in meat, and 55% in vegetables.

Hong Kong homes and kitchens tend to be small due to a high population density, and traditional Chinese cuisine often requires the freshest possible ingredients, so food shopping is undertaken frequently and in smaller quantities than is now usual in the West. Takeaway and dining out are also very common, since people are often too busy to cook with an average 47-hour work week.

Traditional street stalls, specialty foods, pastries, and restaurants have become integral parts of the Hong Kong culture. Dining has evolved from a necessity for sustenance into pursuit of aesthetic, aroma, and exquisite flavor.

== History ==
=== 18th century ===
- Demands for Chinese goods such as silk, porcelain, tea spices created a trade imbalance between China and Britain.
- 1838 - The First Opium War shaped Hong Kong cuisine. British smuggled opium from Indian colonies into Chinese ports against the wishes of the Chinese government.
- Western dining was initially reserved for the elites. Post-opium war led to the birth of Cha Chaan Teng (Hong-Kong style cafes). These cafes offered affordable cuisine similar to Western dining to the local population.

=== 19th century: Colonial origins ===
The cuisine of Hong Kong traces its origins to its founding as a British colonial outpost in 1841. Soon after the colony was founded, many Western merchants along with Chinese emigrants from nearby Canton flocked there to conduct business. Initially, Hong Kong society consisted of expatriate upper-class Westerners, working-class Chinese coolies, farmers and fishermen, and middle class Chinese merchants. The simple peasant cuisine was rudimentary compared to the cuisine of 19th century Canton (now commonly known as Guangzhou).

As the colony developed, there arose a need for meals to entertain businessmen. Some Chinese restaurants were founded in the late 19th century and early 20th century as branches of renowned restaurants in Canton and offered elaborate meals consisting of traditional Chinese "eight main courses and eight entrees" (八大八小) types of banquets for 2 taels of silver, at the time equal to a clerk's monthly wage. Before 1935 when prostitution was still legal in Hong Kong, female escorts often accompanied diners to restaurant meals, especially those of a business entertainment nature. Until the Second World War, opium was also offered. For the majority of Chinese who were not part of the merchant class, dining out in restaurants was non-existent and consisted of simple Cantonese country fares. Meat only appeared in festive occasions and celebrations such as birthdays were often done by catering services who prepared the meals at the celebrant's home. The restaurant scene for Europeans in Hong Kong remained separate from Chinese dining. Elaborate Western-style restaurants existed at the likes of Hongkong Hotel and subsequently Gloucester Hotel.

=== 1920s: Cantonese influence ===
Hong Kong's dining lagged behind the then-leader of Chinese cuisine, Guangzhou (also known as Canton), for a long time and many Hong Kong chefs spent their formative years in Guangzhou. Guangzhou was renowned for its food, and there was a traditional saying of "The food is in Canton" (食在廣州). Cantonese cuisine in Guangzhou reached its peak during the 1920s and was renowned in the care in preparation even for peasant fares such as char siu or boat congee. Dasanyuan was renowned for its braised shark fin dish that charged 60 silver yuan, equivalent to 6 months' wage for a working-class family. The Guandong cooking style eventually trickled down to the culinary scene in Hong Kong.

=== 1949: Shanghainese and Western influences ===
The victory of Chinese Communists in the Chinese Civil War in 1949 created a wave of refugees into Hong Kong. A sizeable number of refugees were from non-Cantonese speaking parts of China, including the Yangtze River Delta, and introduced Shanghai cuisine to Hong Kong. On the other hand, most renowned chefs of Canton, now known as Guangzhou in pinyin romanisation, settled in Hong Kong to escape from Communist rule in mainland China. Prostitution and opium had by then long faded from the restaurant scene, and to survive, many restaurants started to tap into profitable new markets by offering yum cha and wedding banquets, which coincided with an increasing interest in Western fare by the Chinese in Hong Kong. Egg tarts and Hong Kong-style milk tea soon became part of Hong Kong's food culture. It could be argued that the seeds of Hong Kong society as understood today were not sown until 1949, and the cuisine of Hong Kong has its direct roots in this period.

=== 1960s–1980s: Prosperity ===
By the 1960s, Hong Kong was past the worst of the economic depression, and there was a long and continuous period of relative calm and openness compared to the Communist rule in Mao Zedong-era China and martial law isolation in Taiwan. The Cantonese cuisine in Hong Kong had by then surpassed that of Guangzhou, which had witnessed a long period of decline after the Communists came to power. The rising prosperity from the mid-1960s had given birth to increasing demand for quality dining. Many of the chefs, who spent their formative years in pre-Communist Guangzhou and Shanghai, started to bring out the best of fine dining specialties from pre-1949 Guangzhou and Shanghai. Families had largely abandoned catering services and resorted to restaurants for celebratory meals. Seafood started to become specialised delicacies in the 1960s, followed by game in the 1970s.

This wave of prosperity propelled Hong Kong Chinese's awareness of foreign food trends, and many were willing to try foreign ingredients such as asparagus and crayfish from Australia. Foreign food styles such as Japanese and Southeast Asian cuisine started to influence local food, and the pace of change accelerated during the late 1970s and early 1980s. This gave birth to nouvelle Cantonese cuisine (Chinese: 新派粵菜; Cantonese Yale: Sānpaai Yuhtchoi) that incorporated foreign dishes such as sashimi into Cantonese banquets. For the first time, many Hong Kong Chinese started to have the economic means to visit many Western restaurants of the domain of mainly wealthy expatriate Westerners such as Gaddi's of the Peninsula Hotel. During these years, there was great wealth growth from stock market investments, and one visible manifestation of the resultant nouveau riche mentality in 1970s Hong Kong were sayings such as "mixing shark fin soup with rice" (Chinese: 魚翅撈飯; Cantonese Yale: Yùhchi Lōufaahn).

=== 1980–1990s: links with mainland China and Taiwan ===
China initiated the reform and opening up when Deng Xiaoping came to power after Mao Zedong died. The opening up of the country gave chefs from Hong Kong chances to reestablish links with chefs from mainland China severed in 1949 and opportunities to gain awareness of various regional Chinese cuisines. Many of these cuisines also contributed to nouvelle Cantonese cuisines in Hong Kong. The lift of martial law in Taiwan in 1987 jump-started Taiwanese links with mainland China and has caused a proliferation of eateries specialising in Taiwanese cuisine in Hong Kong as Taiwanese tourists and businessmen used Hong Kong as a midpoint for visits to mainland China. From 1978 until 1997 there was no dispute Hong Kong was the epicenter of Chinese, not only Cantonese, cuisine worldwide, with Chinese restaurants in mainland China and Taiwan, and among overseas Chinese communities, racing to employ chefs trained or worked in Hong Kong and emulating dishes improved upon or invented in Hong Kong. Hong Kong–style Cantonese cuisine (Cantonese Yale: Góngsīk Yuhtchoi) became a coinword for innovative Chinese cuisine during this period. It was even unofficially rumoured the Chinese government had secretly consulted the head chef for the Peking Garden Restaurant of Hong Kong, part of the Maxim's restaurant and catering conglomerate, to teach chefs back at the renowned Quanjude restaurant in Beijing how to make good Peking duck, Quanjude's signature dish, in the early 1980s as the skills to produce the dish were largely lost during the Cultural Revolution.

=== Post-1997 ===
After Hong Kong was returned to China in 1997, the Asian financial crisis and SARS epidemic led to a decade-long depression. The boom in Hong Kong culinary scene came to a halt and many restaurants were shuttered, including a number of renowned eateries such as Sun Tung Lok. It is argued that the catch up in prosperity among populations from coastal regions of China, particularly the nouveau riche (derogatory Chinese: daai foon 大款) and corrupted officials (derogatory Chinese: daai ye 大爺), has driven up the demand of many delicacies such as abalone and grouper, and many celebratory dishes have become outrageously expensive that they are beyond the reach of even many upper-middle class Hong Kong families. At the same time, Hong Kong people's tastes have become cosmopolitan when compared with one generation ago. Many are now able to appreciate specific European cuisines rather than one generic "Western cuisine", and appreciation of other Asian cuisines, especially Japanese cuisine and Thai cuisine has been ever increasing. These have produced a proliferation of many specialist ethnic cuisine restaurants geared towards young middle class couples on one hand, and a consolidation of fine-dining Cantonese restaurants on the other.

As of the early 21st century Hong Kong, notwithstanding the partial recovery of Hong Kong's economy from the slump in 2003 due to the SARS epidemic, many pundits argue that contemporary Hong Kong's economy is heavily skewed towards real estate development and financial services. This provides prosperity to only a select few minority and an uncertain long-term economic fortune vis-a-vis more diversified mega-rich cities in China such as Shanghai and Guangzhou, and the territory therefore no longer possesses the economic base to support mass-level super fine-dining that is required to sustain an active dining culture. A common perception of Hong Kong's current culinary culture is one being in decline and resting on past laurels. For example, culinary magazines such as Eat and Travel Weekly report fewer fundamentally new dishes being invented in Hong Kong post-2000 than the 1980s heyday, and many restaurants tend to resort to popularise haute dishes invented in the 1980s. Modern Hong Kong's labour market has also disrupted the traditional ways of grooming Chinese chefs, which henceforth been trained in a very long and drawn one-to-one practical apprenticeships. Very few chefs are willing to sacrifice their time and effort to produce traditional cooking that discourages cutting corners, and emphasises techniques over ingredients' net economic worth. On the other hand, a minority of optimistic pundits argue Hong Kong may well develop a foodie culture similar to other developed economies and preserve the best of traditional cooking.

Historically, Hong Kong's food source came from a combination of mini stores instead of supermarkets. Some of the stores included: rice dealers (Chinese: 米舖; Cantonese Yale: Máihpou), serving as mini rice storage warehouses; wine shops (Chinese: 辦館; Cantonese Yale: Baahn gún), which offered beverages; convenient stores (Chinese: 士多; Cantonese Yale: Sidō, Cantonese rendering of "store"), which were single convenient stores, most notable for serving fresh baked bread. The main component was wet markets (Chinese: 街市; Cantonese Yale: Gāaisíh) – one of the first market gatherings in Hong Kong was Central Market that began in the 1840s.

The idea of a single facility or supermarket that provided all food ingredients did not take place until the early 1970s when Wellcome, a local grocery chain, changed its format into a supermarket. Air-conditioned supermarkets did not become standardised until the 1980s. The early 21st century Western environmentalism- or sustainability-inspired food trends, such as natural food, organic food, non-genetically modified food, local food, and farmer's markets, have been ignored by a majority of Hong Kong's populations. The Western farmer's market share some similarities with the traditional Chinese wet markets, however support of wet markets is largely based on traditional Chinese cultural preference rather than sustainability, and wet markets contain many features that are condemned by modern Western environmentalists on the grounds of "animal cruelty" (live animals sold for food) and "high food miles" (fruits and seafood from another continent).

== Eating habits ==
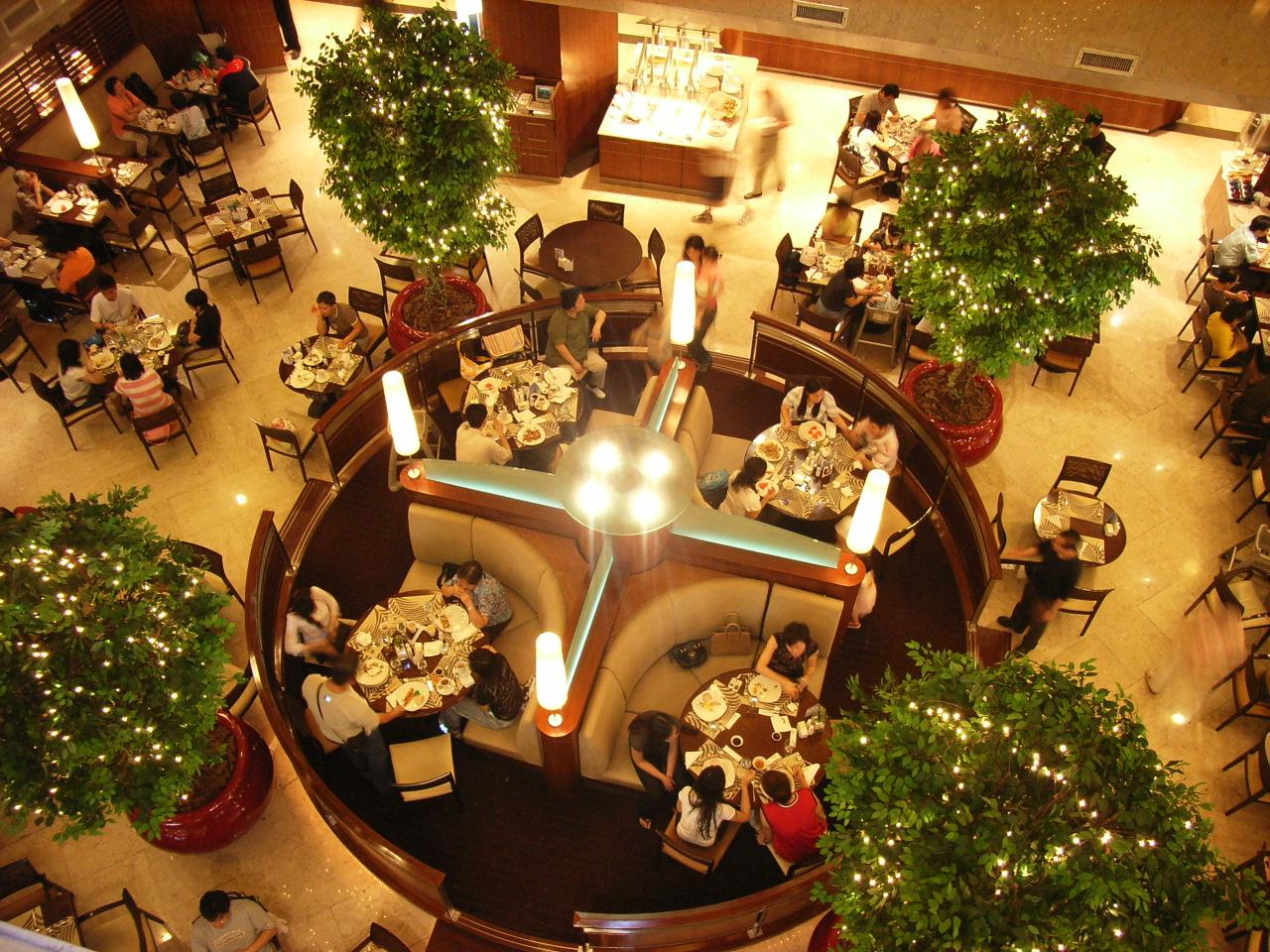
People enjoying a meal

The main course is usually accompanied by a generous portion of carbohydrates such as rice or mein (noodles). People generally eat 5 times a day: a breakfast can be a serving of the staple with garnish eaten at home; a lunch at restaurants could be a set of one to four courses, or a noodle soup or rice plate with servings of the main dish; quick afternoon and late night snacks often involve tea; and the dinner is a big event of the day.

== Teahouses ==
Originating in ancient China, teahouses were a place of rest and socializing for commoners. In Hong Kong, the tradition where people enjoy tea with dim sum is known as yum cha. Yum Cha houses offer dim sums, where one is meant to select a variety of dish that are each small. Because many people work long hours and home kitchens are small, lots of them go to restaurants for eating and socializing, which makes the places noisy. Tea is a crucial part of daily life, dating back to the 7th century, when Chinese tea gained popularity. Culture flourished due to tea trade.

== Ingredients ==
Similar to Cantonese cuisine elsewhere, Hong Kong's cooking uses a wide variety of ingredients and the common ones include:

- Century egg
- Salted duck egg
- Chinese cabbage
- Shiitake
- Watercress
- Soy bean products, including black beans and soy sauce
- Gai lan
- Ginger
- Sesame oil
- Tapioca pearl
- XO sauce
- Red bean
- Hoisin sauce
- Oyster sauce
- Chinese sausage
- Dried shrimp
- Dried scallop
- Jujube
- Lotus seed
- Staple foods:
  - Rice
  - Wheat
  - Tofu
- Meats:
  - Beef
  - Pork
  - Chicken
  - Duck
  - Goose
  - Pigeon
- Seafoods:
  - Abalone
  - Carp
  - Fish maw (dried stomach lining)
  - Grouper, including coral trouts and rock cods
  - Lobster
  - Oyster
  - Pike
  - Prawns
  - Salmon
  - Shark
  - Sole
  - Yellow croaker
  - Eggs of fowls and seafood
- Fruits:
  - Pomelo
  - Custard apple
  - Durian
  - Guava
  - Jackfruit
  - Longan
  - Lychee
  - Mango
  - Mangosteen
  - Papaya
  - Pineapple
  - Rambutan
  - Starfruit
  - Tamarind
  - Winter melon
- Vegetables:
  - Asparagus
  - Aubergine
  - Bamboo shoot
  - Bean sprout
  - Bitter melon
  - Daikon
  - Flowering cabbage
  - Jimaca
  - Long beans
  - Mustard green
  - Taro root
  - Water chestnut
  - Water spinach
- Mushrooms:
  - Chinese black mushroom
  - Tree ear mushroom
  - Straw Mushroom

== Chinese and other Asian styles ==
=== Hawker ===
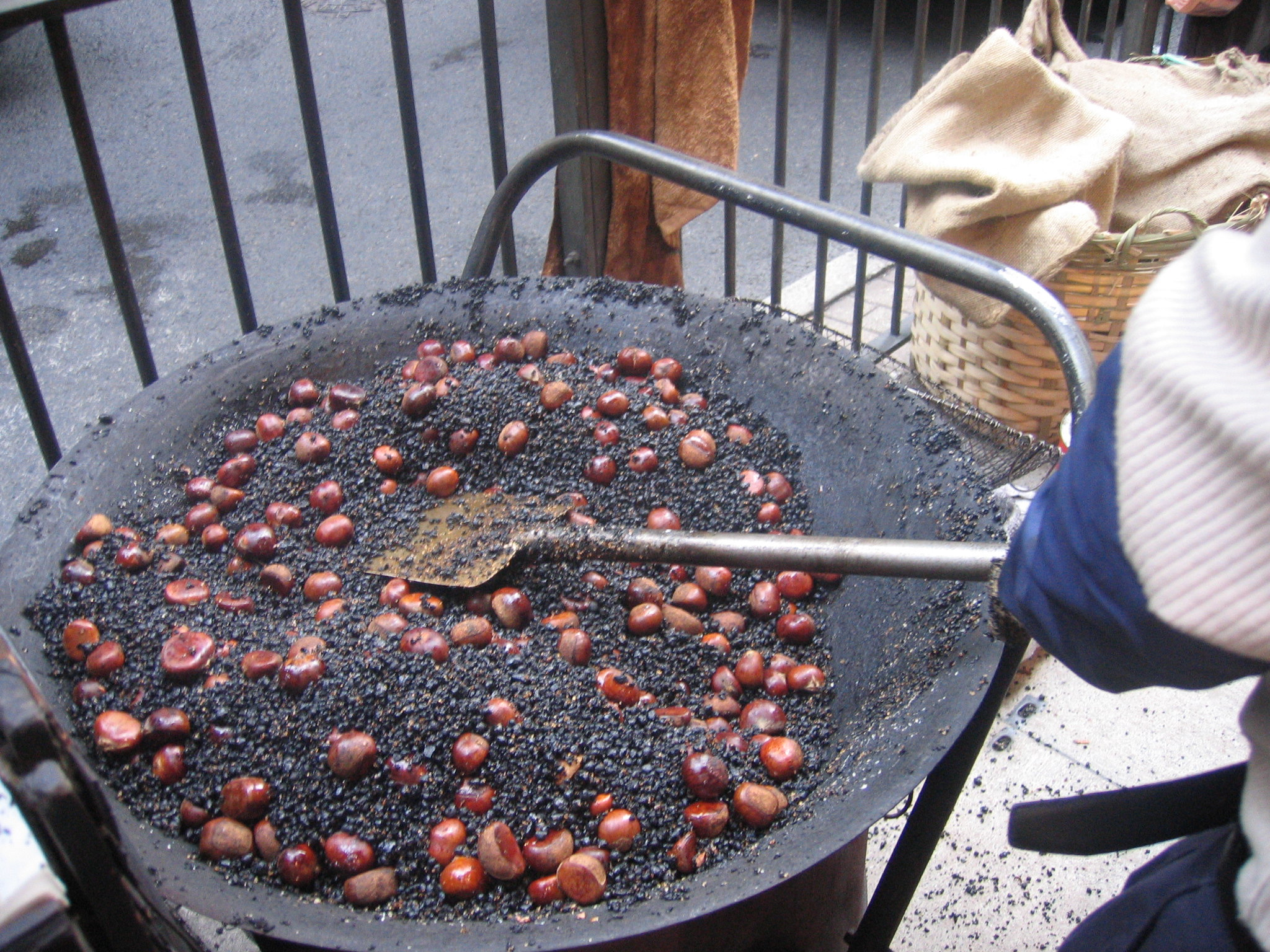
Hawker selling roasted chestnuts

These are streetside food stalls, operated by usually one or two people pushing a cart. The carts are usually very mobile, allowing the businesses freedom to sell snacks in whichever area is most populated at a particular point in time. While they have been popular in the 1970s and 1980s, tight health regulations and other forms of lease versus licensed hawker restrictions have put a burden on this mobile food culture. The term Jau Gwei became associated with the hawkers trying to avoid restrictions.

Cart noodles emerged in the 1950s, when refugees from mainland China were migrating into Hong Kong. To make a living, many turned to operate a mobile food stall.

Examples include:

- Fish ball
- Put chai ko (port cake or 砵仔糕)
- Egg waffle
- Roasted chestnuts

=== Cantonese cuisine ===
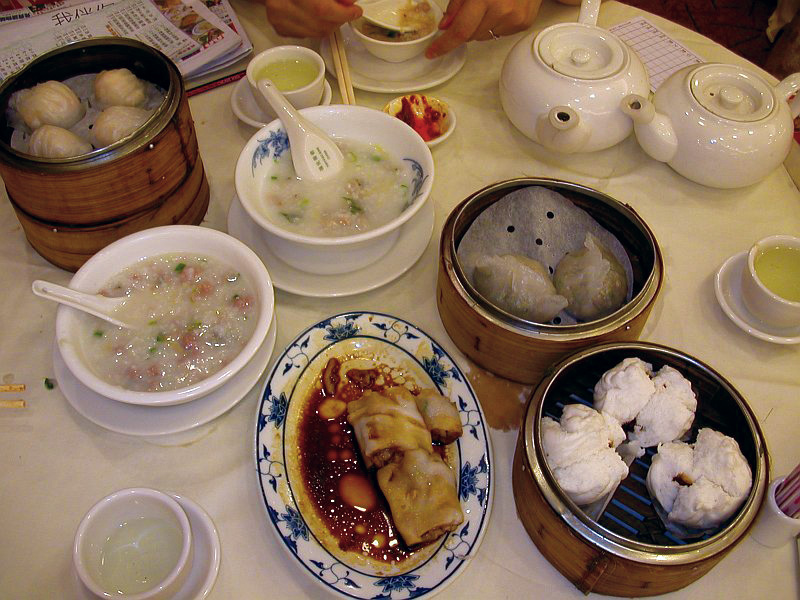
Dim sum

As the most predominant cultural group in Hong Kong, Cantonese food forms the backbone of home cooking and dine-out scenes. Many early celebrated Cantonese restaurants, including Tai San Yuan and Luk Yu Tea House, which were originally Hong Kong branches of the famed Guangzhou-based restaurants, and most chefs in Hong Kong until the 1970s had spent their formative years working in the restaurant industry in Guangzhou. Most of the celebrated dishes in Hong Kong were introduced into the territory through Guangzhou, often refined with awareness of international tastes. Cantonese food prices perhaps cover the widest range, from small businesses’ lou mei to the most expensive abalone delicacies.

One well-developed dish in Cantonese cuisine is dim sum. Waiters' carts carry stacks of steamer baskets or small plates of food for customers to choose from. Dim sum includes dishes based on meat, seafood, and vegetables, as well as desserts and fruit. The term yum cha (lit. 'drink tea') is synonymous with eating dim sum for Hong Kong people. It is customary for families to eat dim sum on weekends. Most foods are steamed, traditionally.

Examples of Hong Kong-style Cantonese cuisine include:

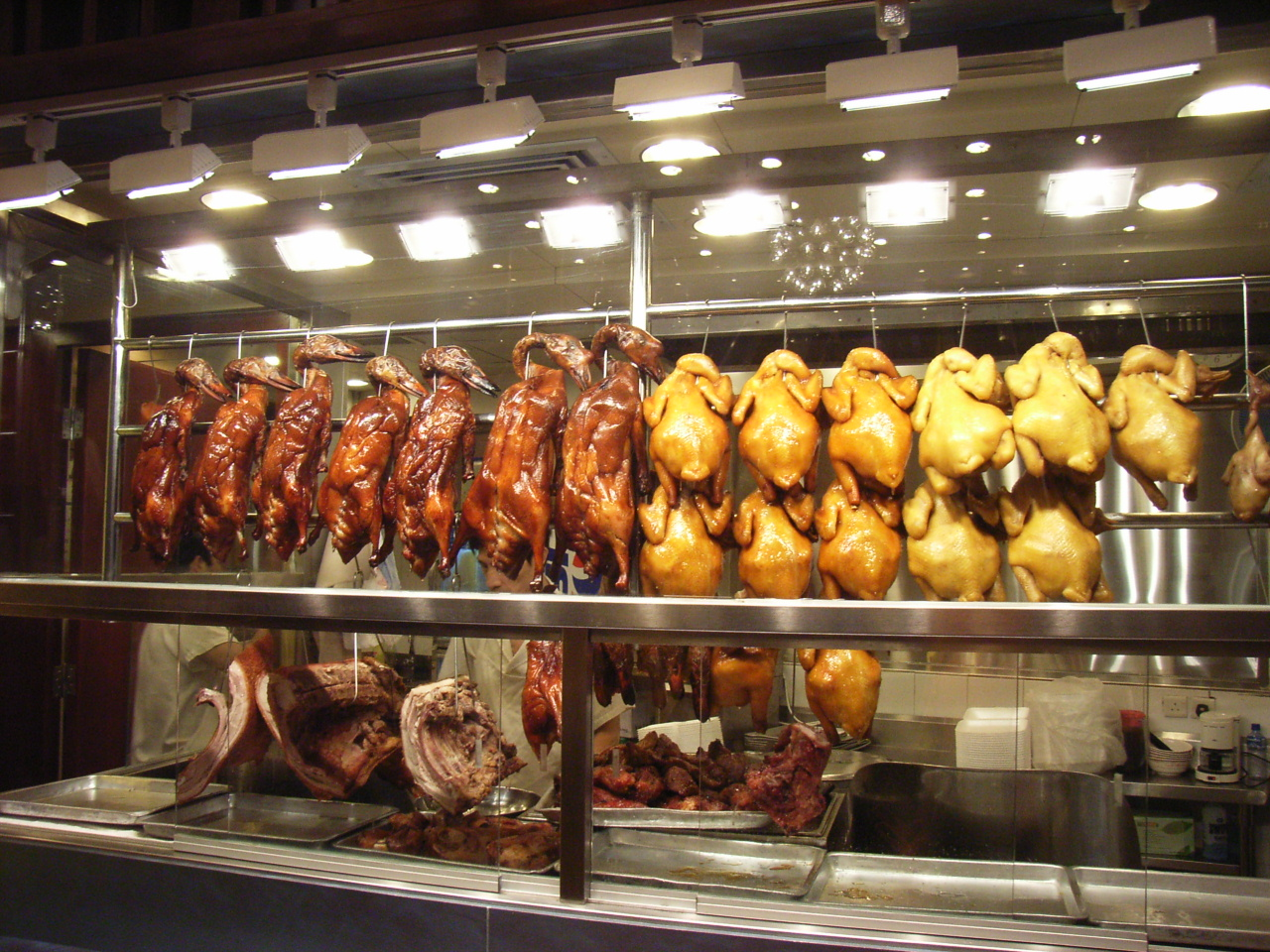
Siu mei

- Siu mei
- Cha siu bao
- Shaomai
- Ha gow
- Steamed meatball
- Lo mai gai
- Fun guo

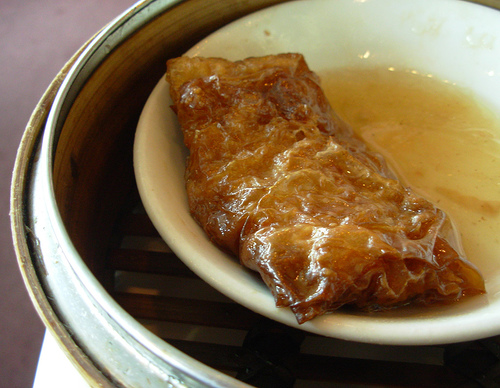
Tofu skin roll

- Tofu skin roll
- Spring roll
- Rice noodle roll
- Fujian fried rice
- Crispy fried chicken
- Seafood birdsnest
- Pork knuckles and ginger stew

=== Hot pot ===
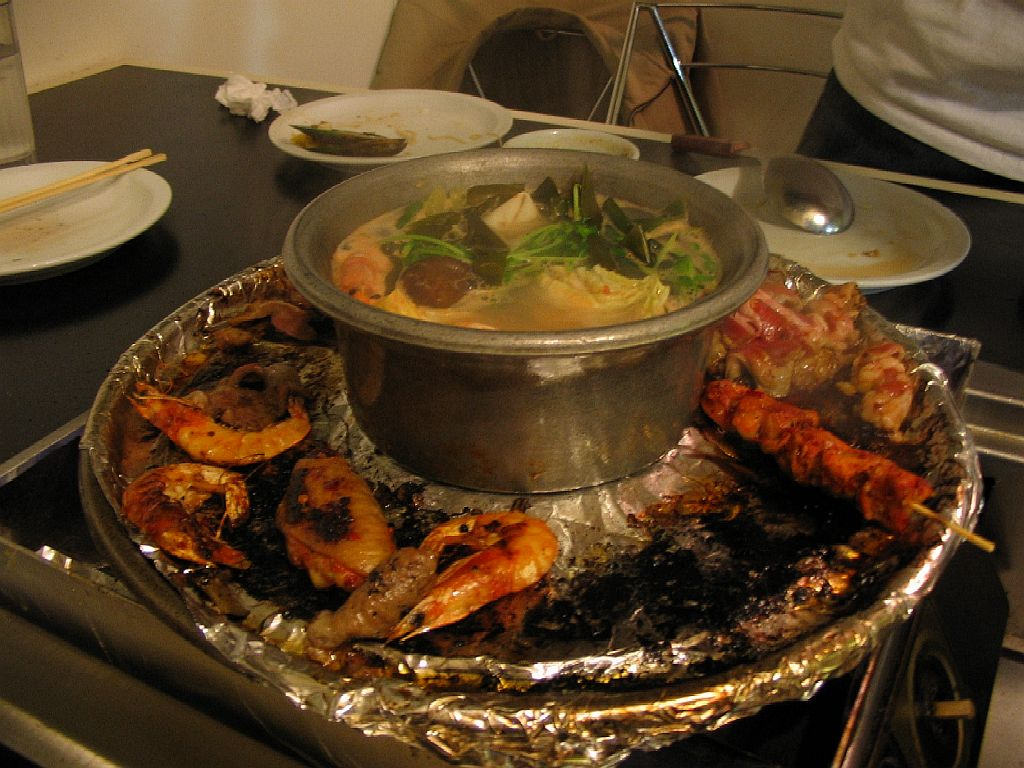
Hot pot

This hot pot cuisine, known as daa bin lou (Chinese: 打邊爐; Jyutping: daa^{2} bin^{1} lou^{4}; pinyin: dǎbiānlú) in Cantonese, is unique in the sense that everyone is a chef. A boiling pot of water (soup-based, and customers can choose their preferred soup taste), is placed in the center of the table, and essentially everyone boils their own ingredients in that pot. This is highly popular and is usually accompanied with a bottle of cold beer or soda. This style is common during frigid winter times, since people are essentially huddled around a fire. This format is also considered entertaining.

Examples include:

- Boiling broth
- Beef, pork, chicken
- Crab, prawns, and clams
- Chinese cabbage, carrots and lettuce
- Fish balls and beef balls
- Tofu
- Noodles

=== Dai Pai Dong ===
Open-air street vendors that sold assortment of affordable, hot, stir-fry dishes. The name means "big license plate stall" which reflected the operating licence that allowed families of civil servant to make a living and legitimise their food businesses. In the 1950s, dai pai dong were everywhere. Now, there are very few dai pai dongs standing.

=== Hong Kong–style desserts ===
Traditional options include "tong sui" (sweet soup), such as red bean, mung bean, black sesame, sago, steamed milk soup. It is said that these sweet soup desserts were popular in cities clustered around the Pearl River Delta.

=== Hong Kong–style drinks ===
Non-alcoholic beverages are particularly associated with cha chaan teng, a unique kind of restaurant in Hong Kong. These cha chaan teng serve Western fusion food. Since drink recipes are not franchise-based, most drinks can vary depending on the restaurant. Rock sugar and syrup are commonly used to add sweetness.

Some beverages that originated in the tea culture of Taiwan, such as bubble tea and honey green tea, had been brought to Hong Kong and become part of Hong Kong's beverage culture.

Examples include:

- Hong Kong–style milk tea
- Coffee
- Yuenyeung
- Red bean ice
- Soy milk
- Sugarcane juice
- Lemon tea
- Lemon water

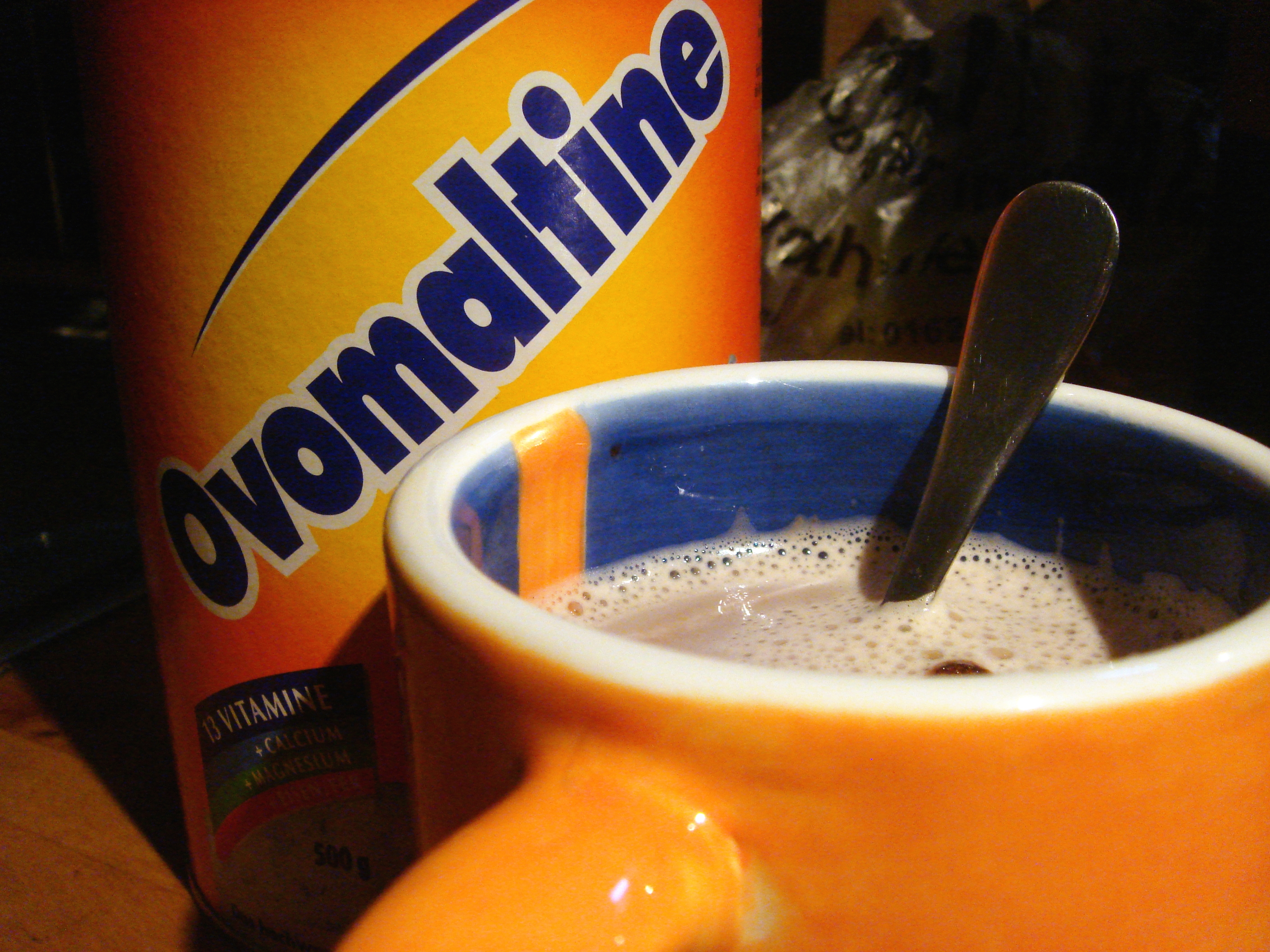
Ovaltine jar and cup, both in the distinctive orange colour

- Ovaltine
- Milo (drink)
- Horlicks
- Almond milk
- Black cow (黑牛)- A cup of ice-cold Coke with a scoop of ice cream floating on top
- 7 Up with salted limes (鹹檸七)- A glass of Sprite or 7-Up with preserved salted limes

=== Chinese tea ===
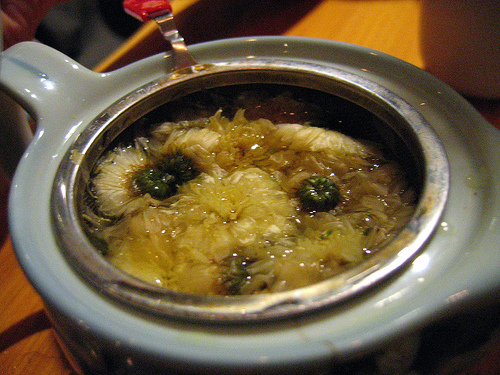
Chinese tea

A large wide variety of tea leaves and combinations are used for Chinese tea. In the 1950s and 1960s, citizens would go to tea houses accompanied by their pet birds locked in a bird cage. Bird owners would bring their birds to the teahouses to socialize with others. Noon tea was an essential break in the middle of the day. Tea nowadays goes along with any meal.

Examples include:

- Chrysanthemum tea
- Bolay
- Jasmine tea
- 24 flavors

== Western styles ==
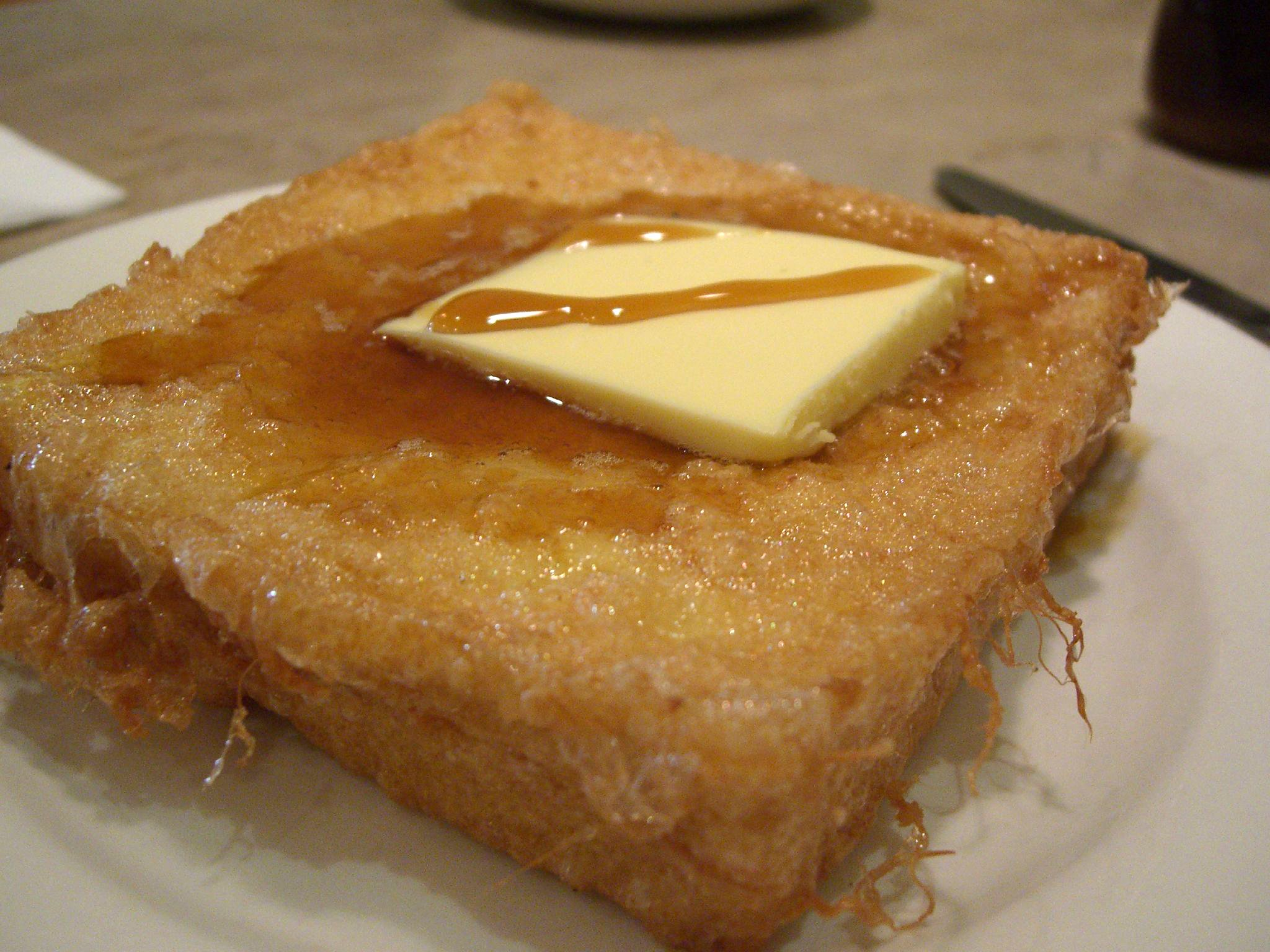
Hong Kong-style French toast

=== Hong Kong–style Western cuisine ===
Dishes derived from cuisines of the Western world, but not classified into a particular country, belong in this category. It is known in Hong Kong as sai chaan (西餐, 'Western cuisine'), and outside of Hong Kong as Hong Kong–style Western cuisine or Canto-Western cuisine. Restaurants that offer this style of cuisine are usually cha chaan teng (茶餐廳, Hong Kong-style diners) at the popular end, and sai chaan teng (西餐廳, 'Western restaurants') at the more upscale range. Restaurants that have come to expect tourists will likely offer both east and west menus. Most dishes are localised with Chinese tastes and contain Chinese and specifically Cantonese influences, such as beef tenderloin marinated in soy sauce, served in a gravy dominated by soy sauce, and with fried rice or pasta on the side.

Cha Chaan Teng traces back to the 1940/50s. The working class craved similar experiences to the elites who experienced luxury meals. It evolved from bing sutt ("ice room") of Guangzhou in China. This Hong-Kong style cafe became the place for social gatherings or a quick bite. Eating pineapple bun (bo lo bao) and drinking milk tea became the ritual of dining at a Cha Chaan Teng. These cafes primarily offered meals such as wonton noodles, rice dumplings, congee, egg tarts, and "pantyhose milk tea". Also, increasing popularity of Japanese cuisine led to incorporation of Japanese dishes such as buttered bread and cutlets.

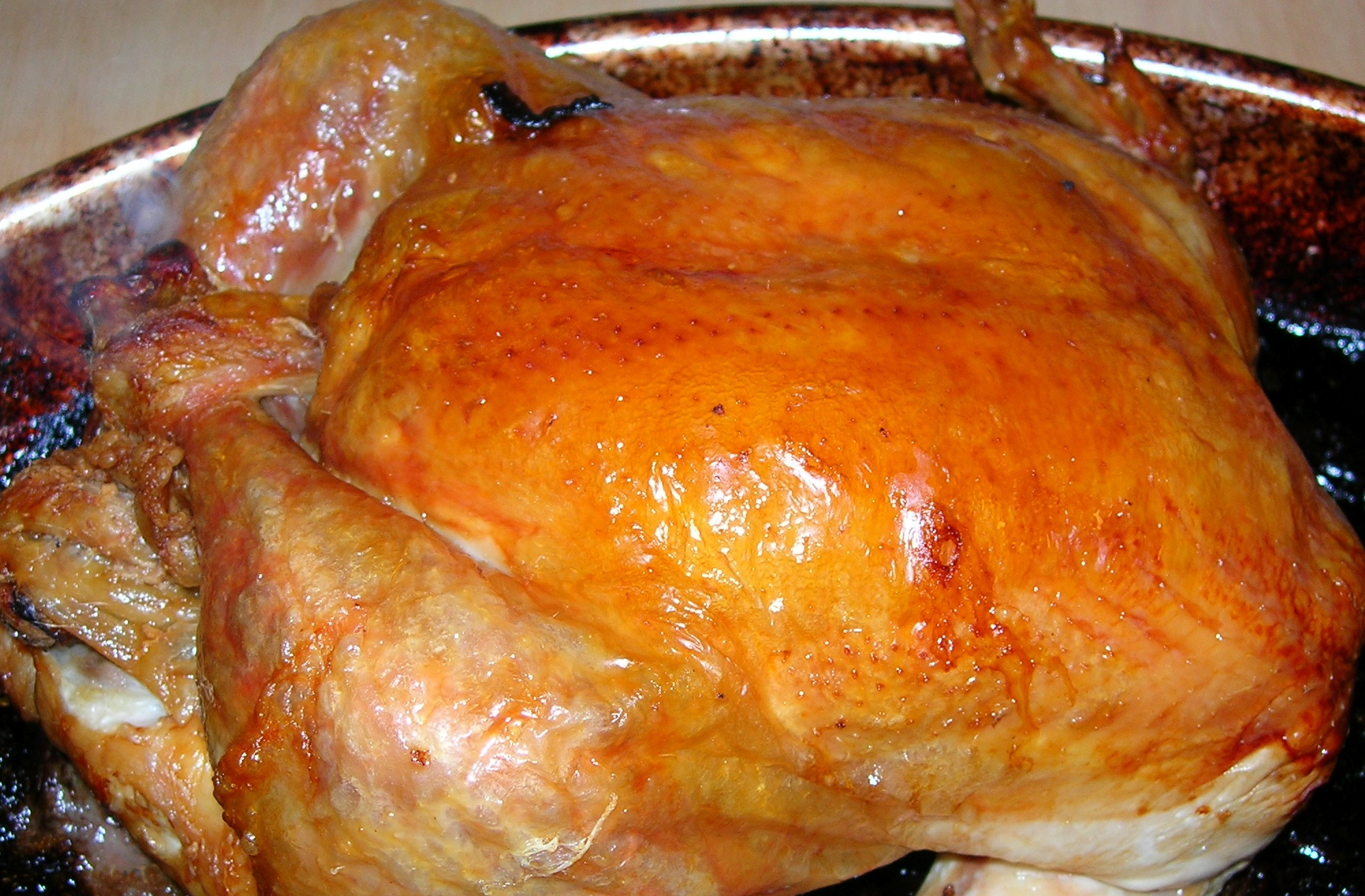
Lemon chicken

Examples include:

- Egg and beef sandwich, made from two slices of white bread, corned beef (preferred by 20th century British settlers to local, unprocessed beef) and fluffy scrambled eggs (an ingredient first added at cha chaan tengs), often made fluffy by added milk or cream, and corn starch
- Egg tart
- Macaroni in broth with fried egg and sausage or thinly sliced ham
- Fried chicken wings, sometimes served with French fries and salad
- Chinese-style beef tenderloin (zh:中式牛柳)
- Lemon chicken (zh:西檸雞)
- Swiss sauce chicken wings
- Salad pork ribs (zh-yue:沙律骨): fried pork ribs with mayonnaise and condensed milk
- Instant noodles with sausages, fried eggs, or thinly sliced ham
- French toast, called sai do si (西多士, 'Western toast', shortened from 法蘭西多士, transliteration of French toast) in Chinese
- Baked pork chop rice, baked with fried pork chop and fried rice, usually served with tomato sauce and cheese
- Hong Kong-style borscht soup (cooked with tomatoes, but usually without beetroot or sour cream)
- Hong Kong–style milk tea, a beverage made of Ceylon tea, black tea, and milk
- Lemon tea (black tea with slices of fresh lemon), served hot or cold, usually with syrup

== See also ==
- Barbecue in Hong Kong
- Cantonese cuisine
- Macanese cuisine
- Culture of Hong Kong
- Upstairs cafés in Hong Kong
- List of Chinese dishes
- Private kitchen
- Traditional candies in Hong Kong
- Hong Kong Chefs Association
