= Mtori =

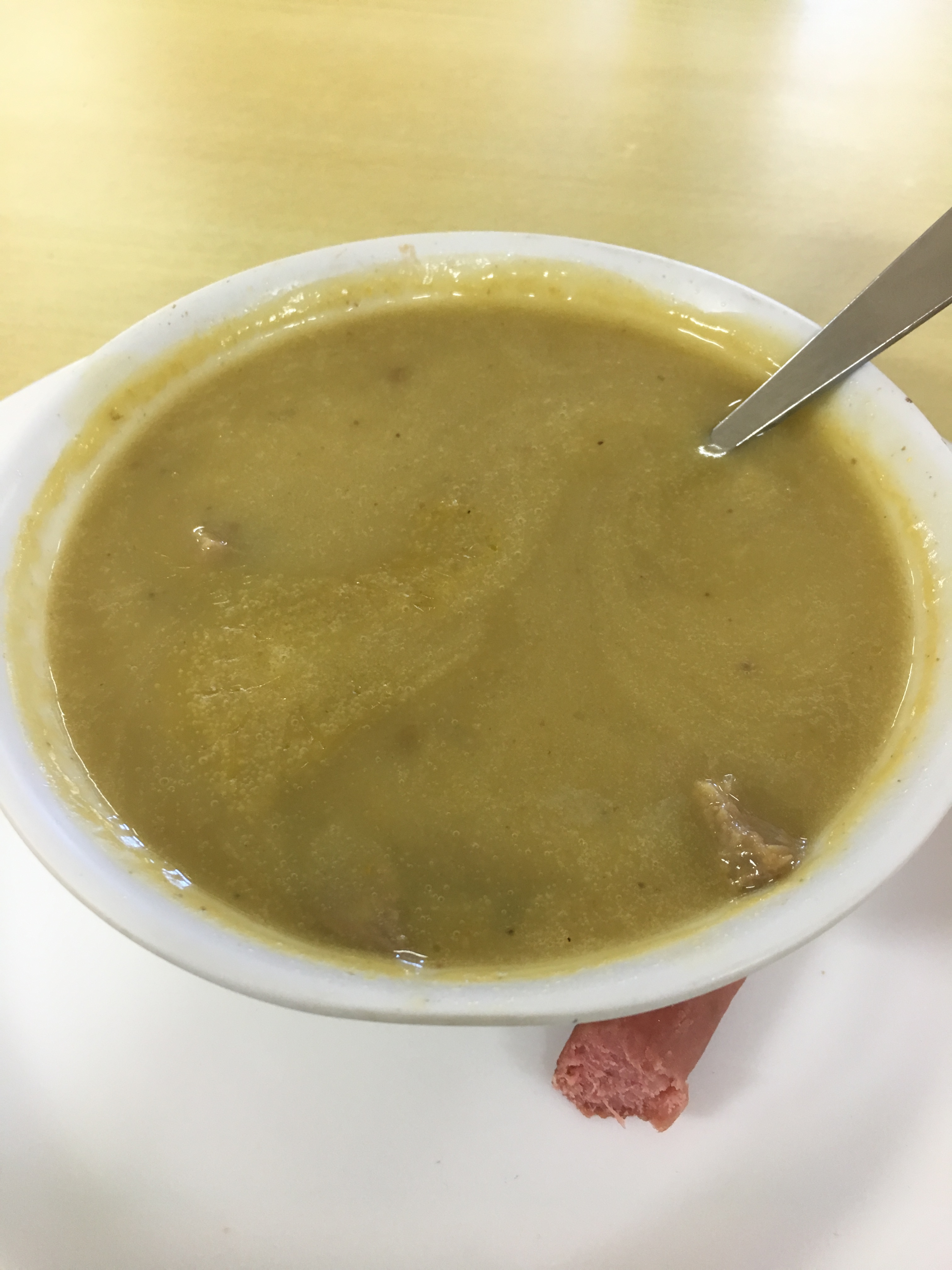
- Type: Stew
- Place of origin: Tanzania
- Main ingredients: bananas, meat

Mtori is a popular Tanzanian stew made of bananas and meat along with other ingredients (e.g. potatoes, milk or cream).

The soup originated in the Kilimanjaro area of Tanzania, specifically the Moshi-Arusha region. Plantains/green bananas are often eaten in this region as the main source of starch. It has since spread to other areas throughout Tanzania. A special stick is traditionally used to mash the bananas. Mtori is often eaten by Maasai women during a three-month period postpartum confinement for nutrition. During this postpartum period, women are given mainly soft foods (laini) to eat like mtori.

Because it is a thick stew, it can be served as a main course. It can be eaten during breakfast, lunch, or dinner.

== See also ==
- List of African dishes
