= Honey walnut shrimp =

Western-inspired Cantonese dish

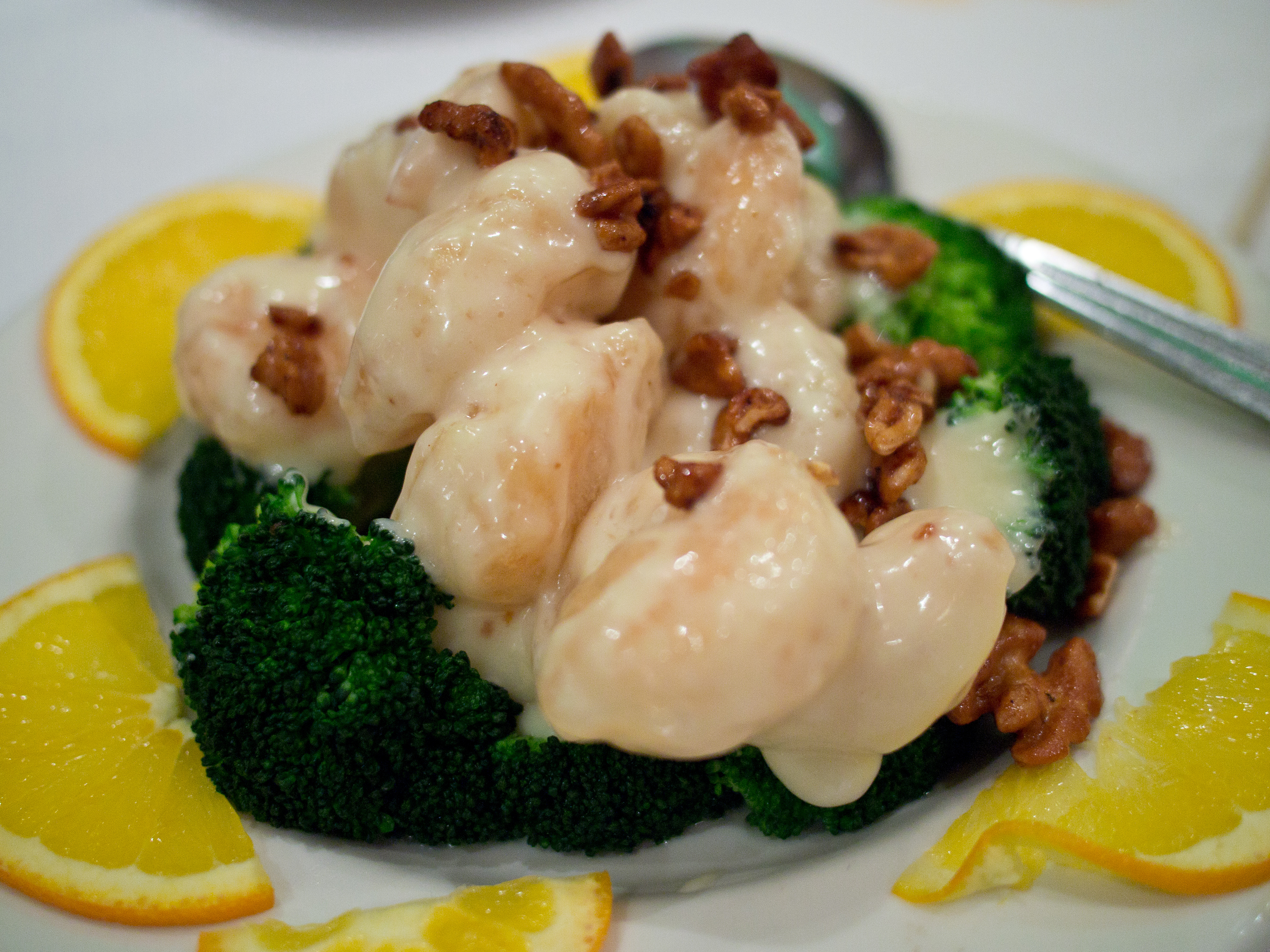
- Course: Entree
- Region or state: Chinese-speaking regions
- Associated cuisine: Hong Kong cuisine, American Chinese cuisine
- Main ingredients: Shrimp, walnuts
- Ingredients generally used: Mayonnaise, condensed milk, honey

Honey walnut shrimp
- Traditional Chinese: 蜜汁核桃蝦
Transcriptions
Standard Mandarin
- Hanyu Pinyin: mìzhī hétáo xiā

Honey walnut shrimp is a Western-inspired Cantonese dish of lightly battered shrimp with nuts in a mayonnaise-based sauce endemic to Chinese banquet meals. The dish may have originated in Hong Kong before spreading to the United States.
