= Gan Guê To =

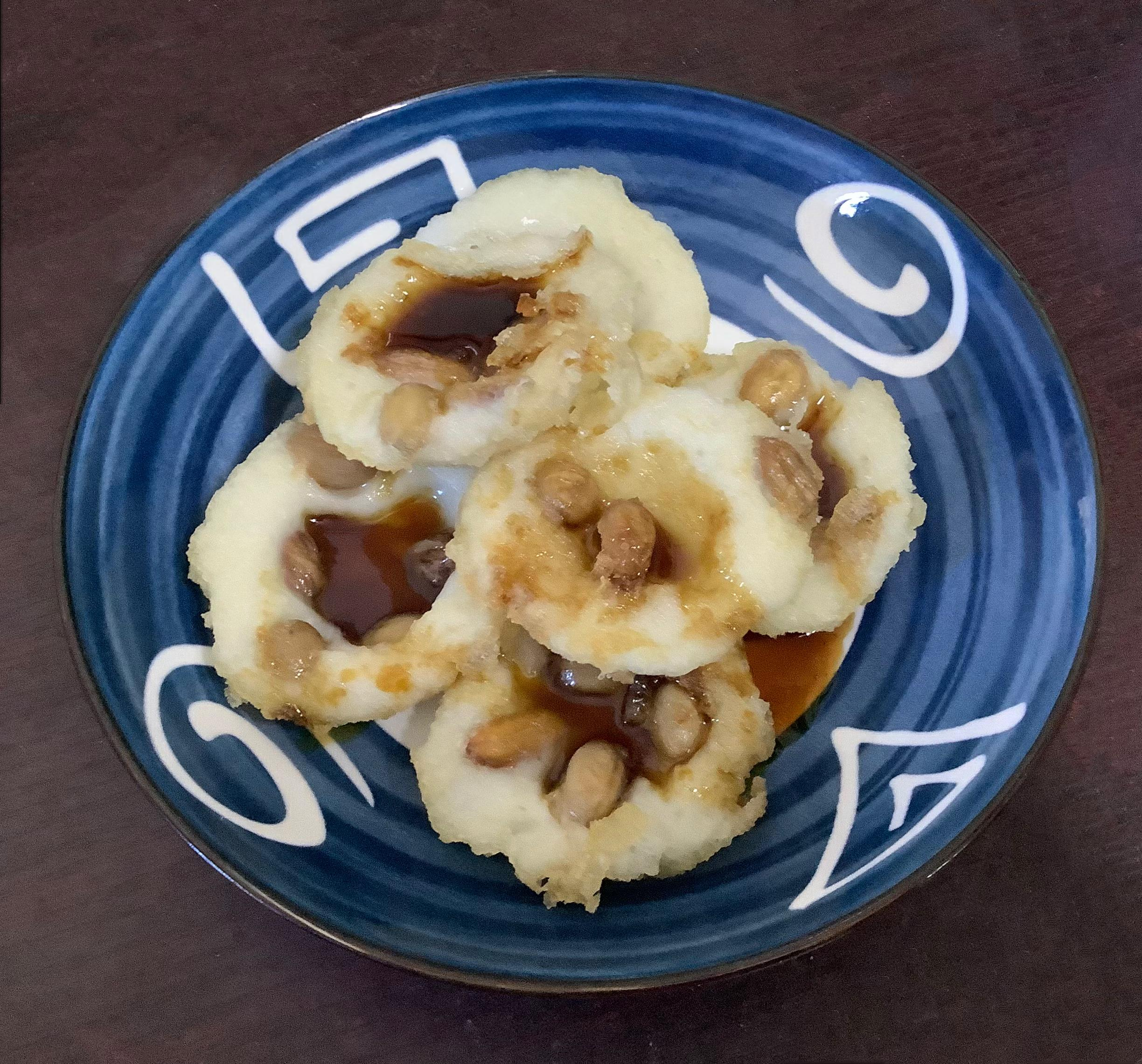
- Type: Snack
- Place of origin: Jieyang, Guangdong, China
- Region or state: Chaoshan
- Main ingredients: Rice milk, peanut, brown sugar

Gan Guê To (Chinese: 酵粿桃; Teochew: gan^{3} guê^{2} to^{5}), also known as Buah Ze Guê (Chinese: 钵仔粿; Teochew: buah^{4} ze^{2} guê^{2}), is a folk snack in Chaoshan area, similar to put chai ko. The production method is to grind rice into rice milk, put it into a special small ceramic bowl, steam it, and then deep-fry it. When eating, pour sauce made of brown sugar on it.

In Chaoshan, there used to be a saying that "even if you have money, you may not be able to buy Gan Guê To" (Chinese: 酵粿桃，有钱买无; Teochew: gan^{3} guê^{2} to^{5}, u^{6} zin^{5} bhoi^{2} bho^{5}).

== See also ==
- Red peach cake
- Put chai ko
