= Put chai ko =

Rice cake

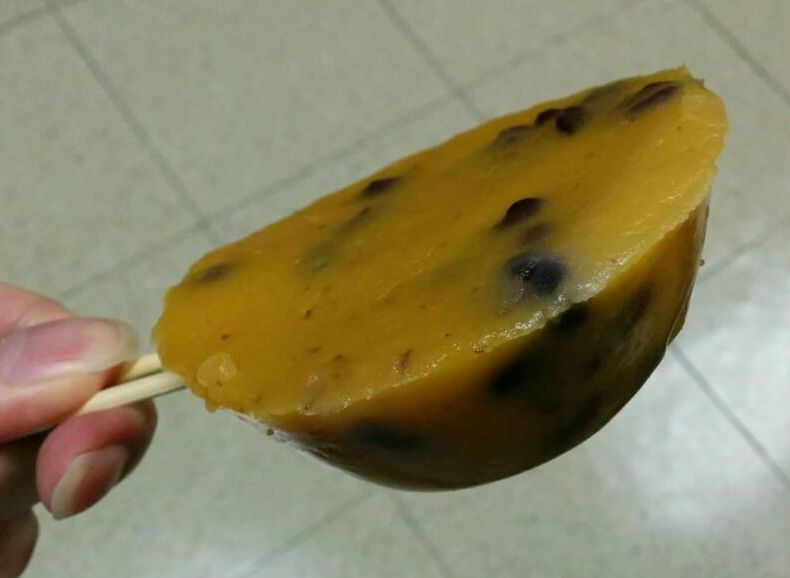
- Type: Rice cake
- Place of origin: Taishan, China
- Region or state: East Asia
- Main ingredients: Sugar, rice flour

Put chai ko
- Chinese: 砵仔糕
- Hanyu Pinyin: bōzǎi gāo
- Cantonese Yale: butjái gōu
- Literal meaning: little bowl cake
Transcriptions
Standard Mandarin
- Hanyu Pinyin: bōzǎi gāo
- Bopomofo: ㄅㄛ ㄗㄞˇ ㄍㄠ
- IPA: [pwótsài káu]
Yue: Cantonese
- Yale Romanization: butjái gōu
- Jyutping: but3zai2 gou1
- Sidney Lau: boot3jai2 gou1
- IPA: [pūːt̚tsɐ̌i kóu]

Put chai ko (Chinese: 缽仔糕 or 砵仔糕; Cantonese Yale: buht jái gōu) is a popular snack in Hong Kong. It is a rice cake made from white or brown sugar, long-grain rice flour with a little wheat starch or cornstarch. Sometimes red beans are also added. The batter is poured into porcelain bowls and steamed until cooked through. Then it is allowed to cool and served at room temperature. Traditionally, the hawker inserts two bamboo skewers into the cake to turn it out and the eater holds the skewers to consume. At present, most put chai ko are sold in plastic bags.

The pudding cake is palm size and is sweet in taste. It is soft, but can hold its molded shape outside a bowl.

== Names ==
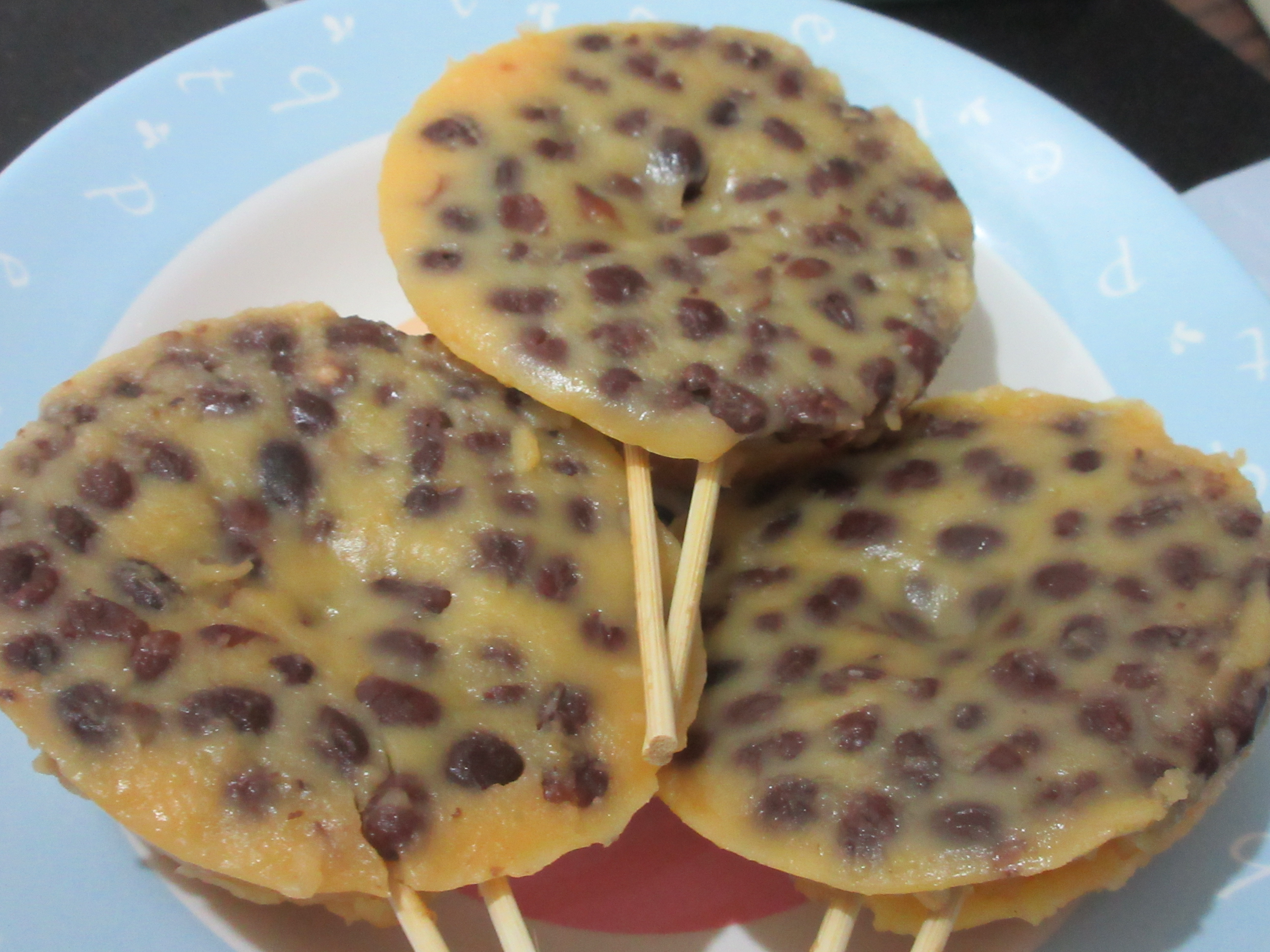
Put chai ko made with azuki beans

The snack is also known by a number of English names, including Put chai pudding, Rice Pudding, Earthen bowl cake, Bootjaigo, Red bean pudding or Put chai ko.

== History ==
The pudding is made like other traditional Cantonese steamed cakes. It is said to have originated in the Chinese county of Taishan, which is 140 km (87 mi) west of Hong Kong. The pudding reached its popularity peak in the early to mid-1980s when hawkers sold it all over the streets in their push carts. At the time, there were only a small handful of flavors. One of the dish's cultural trademarks is that it is served in a porcelain bowl or an aluminium cup. The snack is still available today in select Chinese pastry or snack shops, or from street hawkers. The pudding can also be served like an ice pop, held up by two bamboo sticks.

=== Classic Hong Kong flavors ===
- Plain white sugar
- Brown sugar
- Plain white sugar with azuki beans
- Brown sugar with any one of the beans in the genus Vigna

== Gallery ==
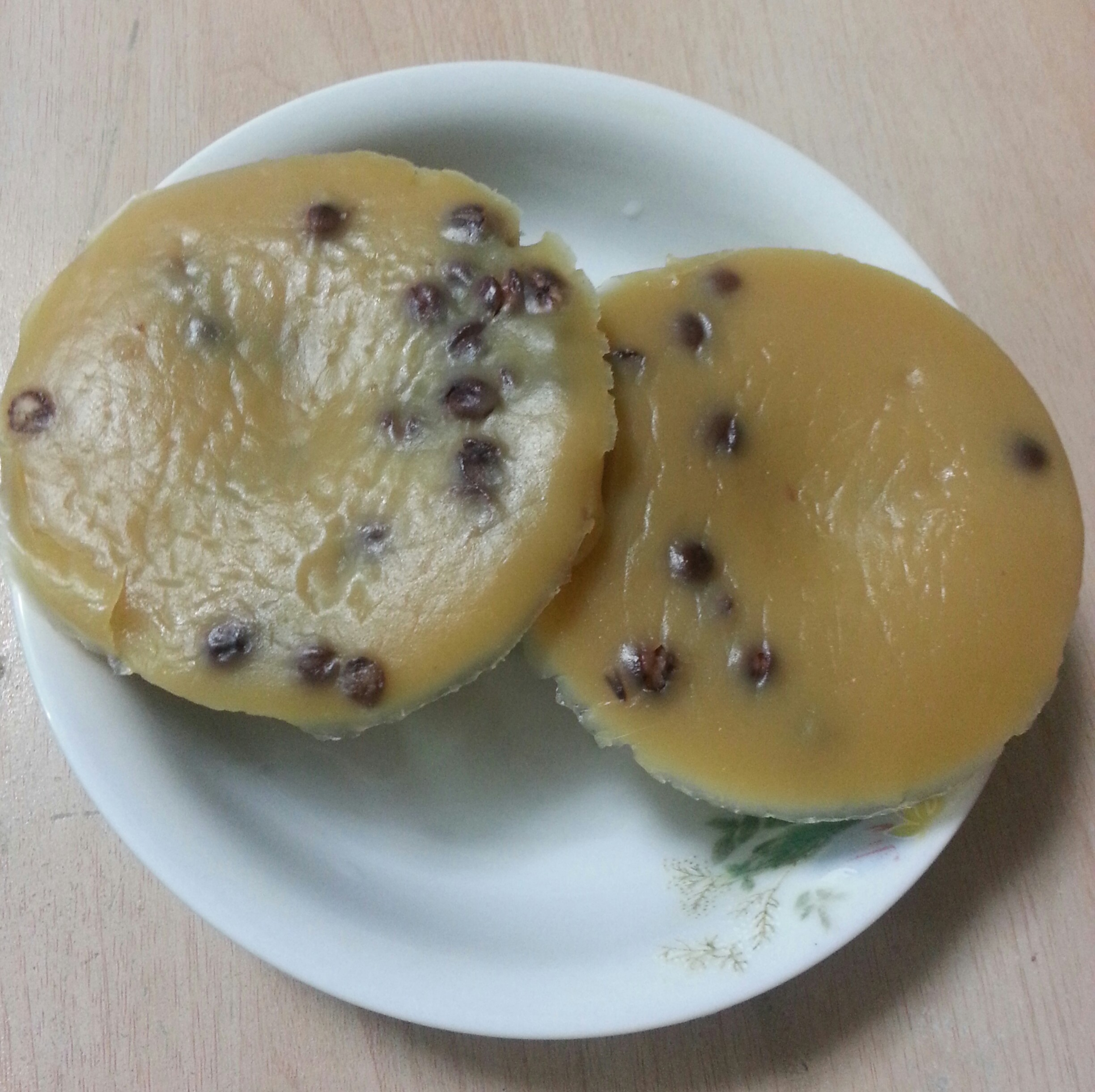

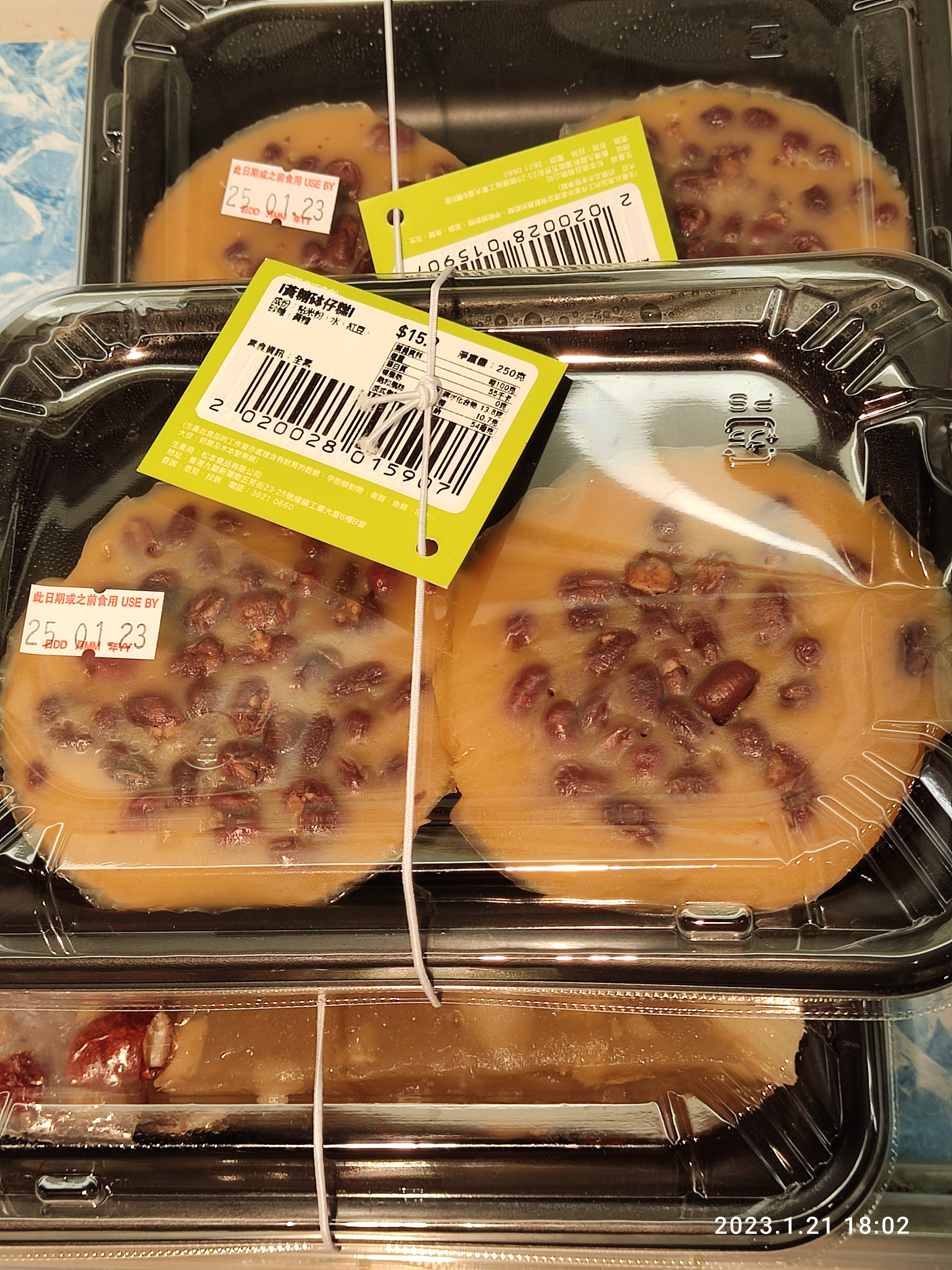

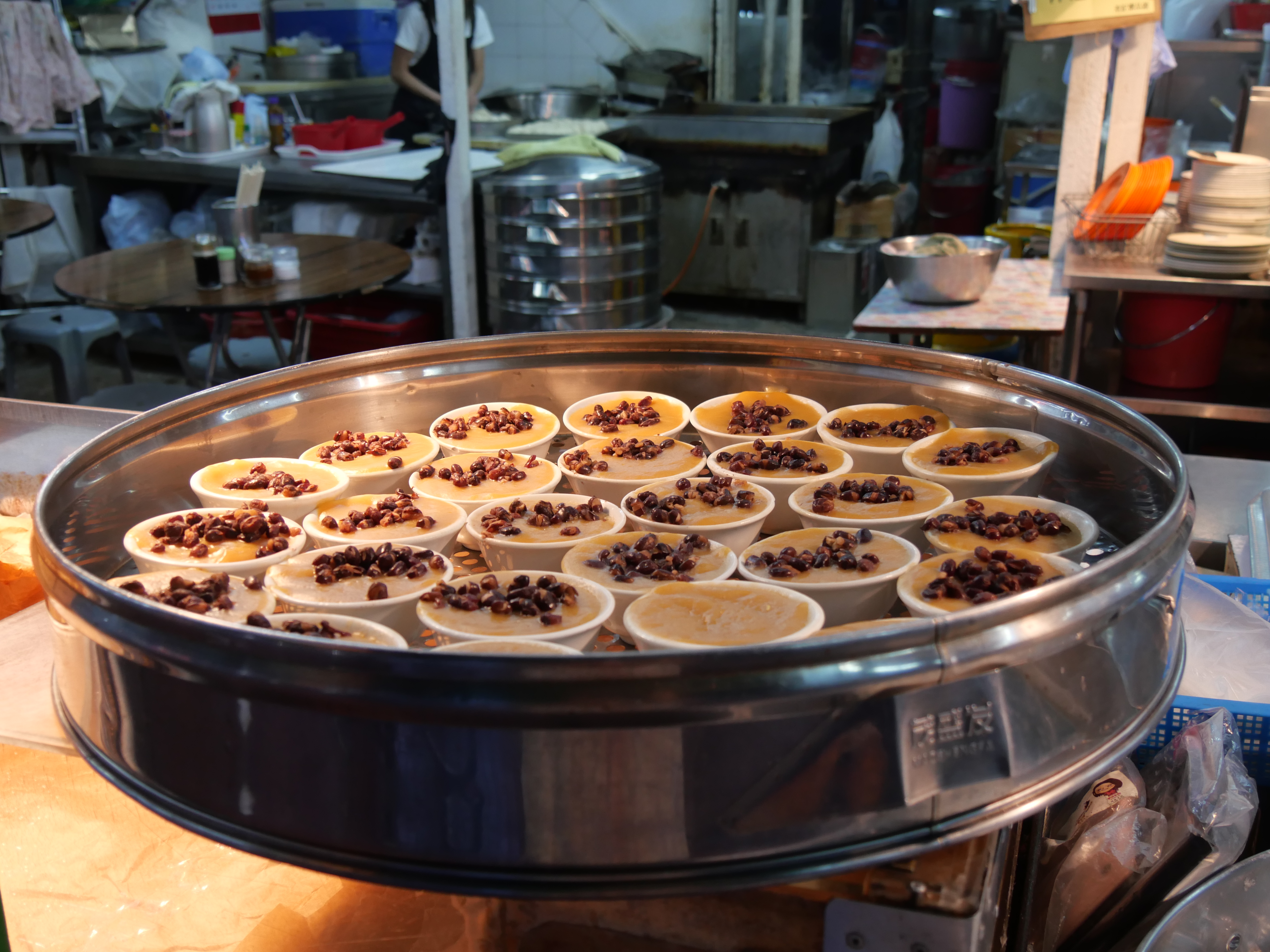

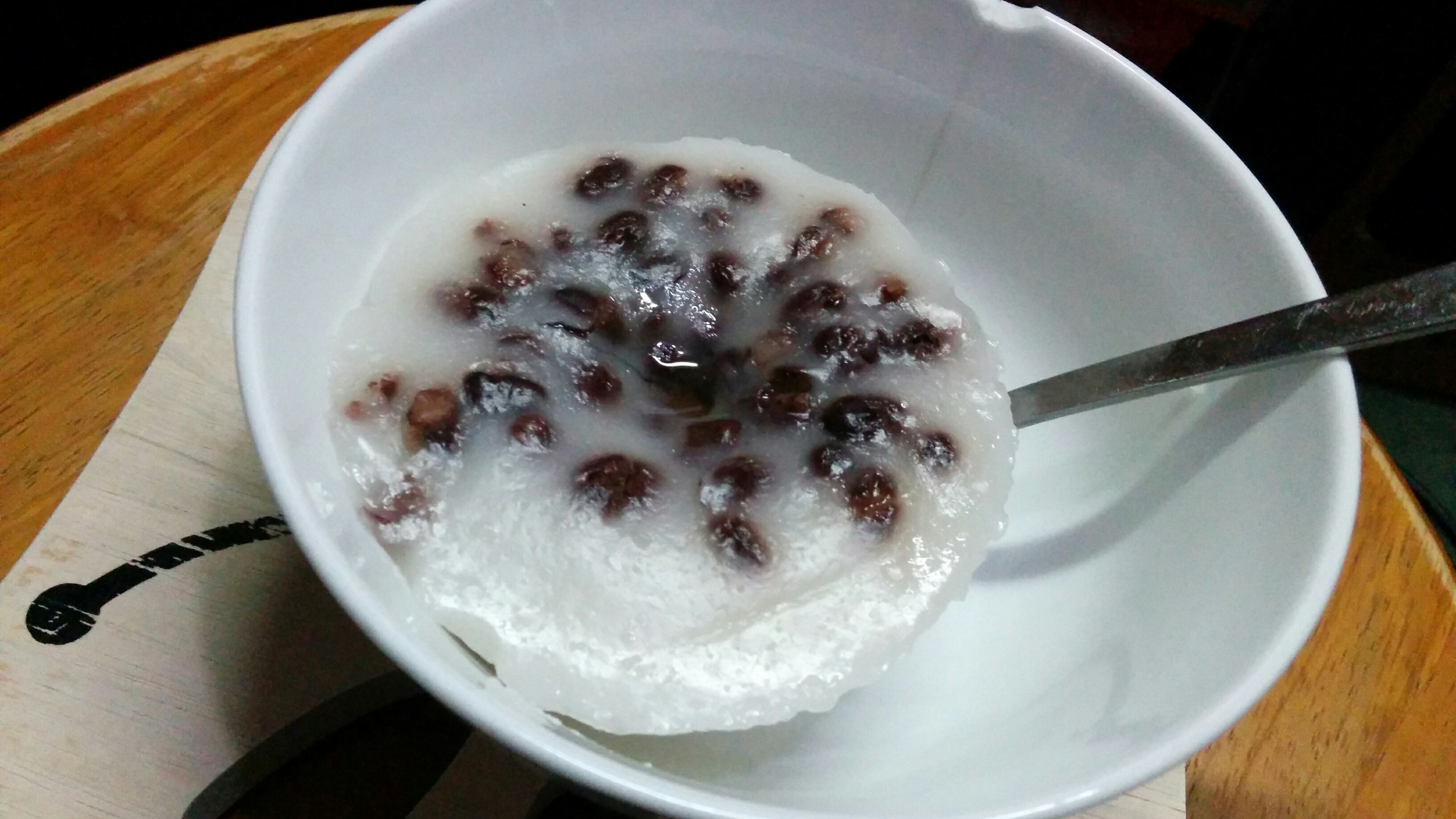
White put chai ko made with white sugar

== See also ==
- Egg tart
- Gan Guê To
- List of steamed foods
- Uirō - Japanese Wagashi
