= Pork knuckles and ginger stew =

Cantonese dish

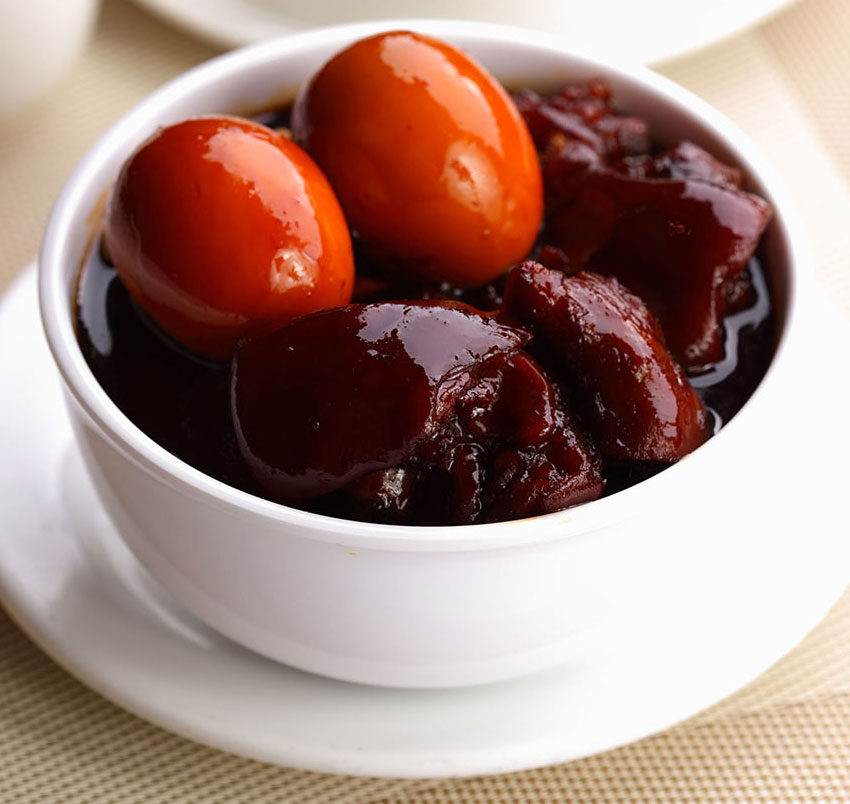
- Pork knuckles and ginger stew
- Type: Stew
- Region or state: Cantonese
- Invented: Ming Dynasty
- Main ingredients: Pig trotters, ginger, sweet vinegar, eggs, salt, and oil
- Similar dishes: Miyeokguk

Pork knuckles and ginger stew (Chinese: 豬腳薑; pinyin: zhū jiǎo jiāng; Cantonese Yale: jyū geuk gēung) is a dish in traditional Cantonese cuisine. It is traditionally eaten by new mothers in Guangzhou to restore strength and health, and is presented to friends and family to indicate the arrival of a new baby.

== Legend ==
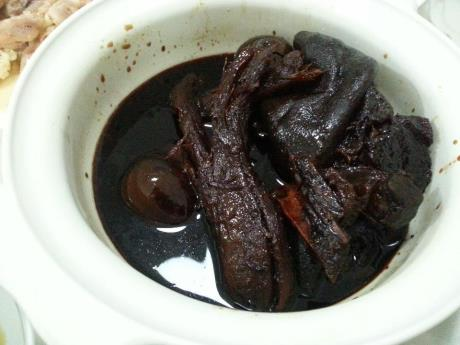
Pork knuckles and ginger stew

According to legend in the early Ming Dynasty there lived a butcher who had the good fortune to marry a very pretty, kind and vivacious girl. However, even after several years of marriage, the wife was still without child. In traditional Chinese feudal culture, failure to bear a descendant to carry on the family name is a serious offense against filial piety. Therefore, the butcher's mother forced the two to divorce.

The wife was heartbroken and left the family home and moved to a hut on a hill. However, to her own surprise she found that she was now pregnant.

The butcher still loved his wife and visited her. When he received the news of her pregnancy, he was afraid that his wife and the newborn would be malnourished, so he brought her some unsold pork knuckles and stewed them in sweet black vinegar in a big pot together with ginger and eggs.

After several years, the child finally grew up. The wife forgave the butcher's mother and returned with her son to the marital home and asked her son to take with him a pot of sweet vinegar stew as a gift for his grandmother. His grandmother was elated to receive him and the stew.

Thereafter, whenever a baby is born, the family will make a pot of sweet vinegar stew and share it with friends and neighbors.

== Tradition ==
Pork knuckles and ginger stew is not an everyday Chinese dish. It is a traditional postnatal therapeutic food in the Guangzhou region of China, eaten to aid the recovery of new mothers after giving birth. It helps in the recovery of maternal health from the fatigue of pregnancy in the first forty days of post-partum confinement known in Cantonese as choyut (坐月).

According to Cantonese custom, Pork knuckles and ginger stew is used to celebrate the birth of a child. The new parents will distribute this dish to their relatives and friends to celebrate the arrival of the newborn twelve days after the baby's birth.

== Nutrition ==
The ingredients used in making pork knuckles and ginger stew are nutritious which help the new mother to recover.

Calcium in the bones of the pork knuckles will be dissolved by the vinegar during the cooking process; a major nutritional benefit of the dish is replenishing calcium lost during pregnancy. Ginger is a source of vitamin C, and although much of this is lost during stewing, the remaining vitamin C helps to strengthen the mother's immune system. Furthermore ginger has the function of removing the "wind", which is known as "fung" in Cantonese, that is generated during childbirth and when the body is at its weakest; ginger also helps lactation. Eggs provide the new mother with large amount of protein which is especially good for repairing muscles. A bowl of pork knuckles and ginger stew has nearly 600 kcal

== Preparation ==
The main ingredients of pork knuckles and ginger stew are pig trotters, ginger, sweet vinegar, eggs, salt, and oil.

The tradition is to cook this dish in a tall earthenware pot with a glazed interior. The acidic vinegar and cooking method will leach metals from iron pots into the stew, more so than with water based stews.

== Commercialisation ==
As a traditional ritual, families usually make the stew themselves, sometimes according to their own secret family recipes. In modern times people are less able to spend the time for the time-consuming preparation of the stew. In Hong Kong, Chinese herbal franchises such as Hung Fook Tong and vinegar maker Pat Chun have started selling ready-to-eat pork knuckle stew.

In 2013 February, Hung Fook Tong launched a promotion selling vouchers for a pot of the delicacy. Customers of the Pat Chun company can order pots of fresh stew and get it delivered from their shops.

== See also ==
- List of pork dishes
- Miyeokguk
- Pickled egg
- Pork jelly
