= Postpartum confinement =

Cultural practice

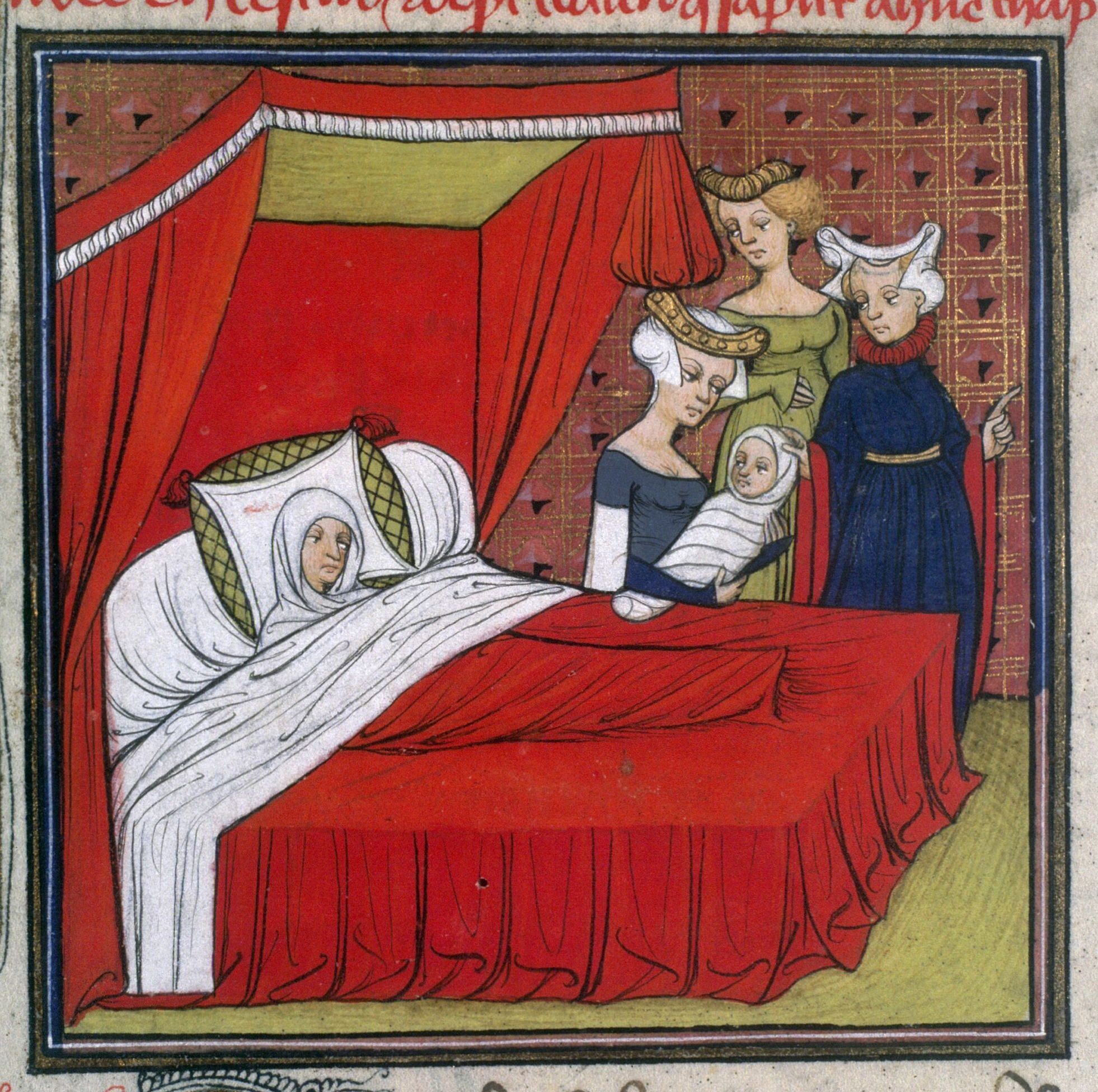
Isabella of Hainault rests after having given birth to the future Louis VIII of France.

Postpartum confinement is a traditional practice following childbirth. Those who follow these customs typically begin immediately after the birth, and the seclusion or special treatment lasts for a culturally variable length: typically for one month or 30 days, 26 days, up to 40 days, two months, or 100 days. This postnatal recuperation can include care practices in regards of "traditional health beliefs, taboos, rituals, and proscriptions." The practice used to be known as "lying-in", which, as the term suggests, centres on bed rest. In some cultures, it may be connected to taboos concerning impurity after childbirth.

== Overview ==
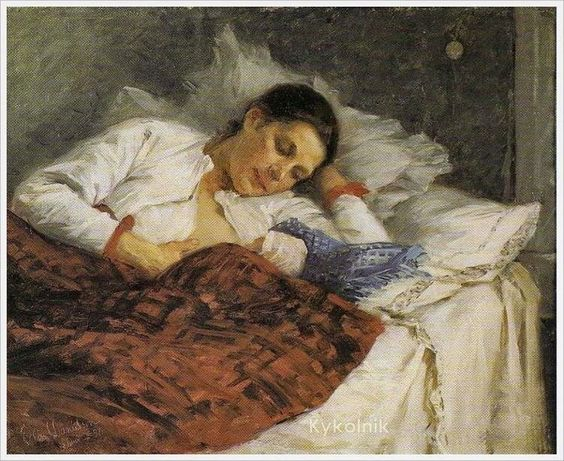
A mother and her newborn rest in bed, breastfeeding

Postpartum confinement refers both to the mother and the baby. Human newborns are so underdeveloped that pediatricians such as Harvey Karp refer to the first three months as the "fourth trimester". The weeks of rest while the mother heals also protect the infant as it adjusts to the world, and both learn the skills of breastfeeding.

Almost all countries have some form of maternity leave. Many countries encourage men to take some paternal leave, but even those that mandate that some of the shared parental leave must be used by the father ("father's quota") acknowledge that the mother needs time off work to recover from the childbirth and deal with the postpartum physiological changes.

A 2016 American book describes the difficulties of documenting those "global grandmotherly customs" but asserts that "like a golden rope connecting women from one generation to the next, the protocol of caring for the new mother by unburdening her of responsibilities and ensuring she rests and eats shows up in wildly diverse places". These customs have been documented in dozens of academic studies, and commonly include support for the new mother (including a release from household chores), rest, special foods to eat (and ones to avoid), specific hygiene practices, and ways of caring for the newborn.

Martha Wolfenstein and Margaret Mead wrote in 1955 that the postpartum period meant a "woman can be cherished and pampered without feeling inadequate or shamed". The 2016 review that quoted them cites customs from around the world, from Biblical times to modern Greece:

From the data it seems that women were housebound for a number of days after the birth and the length of this period of seclusion varied by caste or ethnic group [in Nepal]. This is a phenomenon found across the globe, including in high-income countries in the recent past. The length of time a woman is secluded or rested varied across different countries and the principles underpinning this isolation (to heal vs. being unclean) also seem to differ greatly. After the period of seclusion there is often a ceremony to purify women to publicly accept them back into daily life. The literature supports the concept of a resting – a lengthy lie-in or lying-in period, a period of seclusion, as women need to rest in order to heal, yet it may mean that they are neglected.

== Health effects ==
Research on the health effects of postpartum confinement has produced mixed findings. A 2009 systematic review of English-language studies on Chinese confinement practices concluded, "There is little consistent evidence that confinement practices reduce postpartum depression."

A more recent 2023 systematic review, which included sixteen quantitative studies from China and Chinese immigrant populations abroad, similarly found that "doing-the-month" failed to show a significant overall protective effect against postpartum depression. However, the review noted that four of the sixteen studies did find a reduced risk, suggesting that the quality of and satisfaction with confinement support—rather than mere adherence to the practice—may be a more important factor in maternal mental health outcomes.

A 2024 qualitative meta-synthesis examining postpartum Chinese women's lived experiences of confinement found that women valued the physical rest, social support, and structured recovery period, but that conflicts with caregivers—particularly mothers-in-law—over confinement rules could contribute to psychological distress.

A 2007 qualitative systematic review of traditional postpartum practices across multiple cultures found that common elements—including social support, rest, and special nutrition—were widely perceived as beneficial by mothers, though the review noted a lack of rigorous controlled studies to confirm specific health outcomes.

== By region ==
=== Asia ===
==== China ====
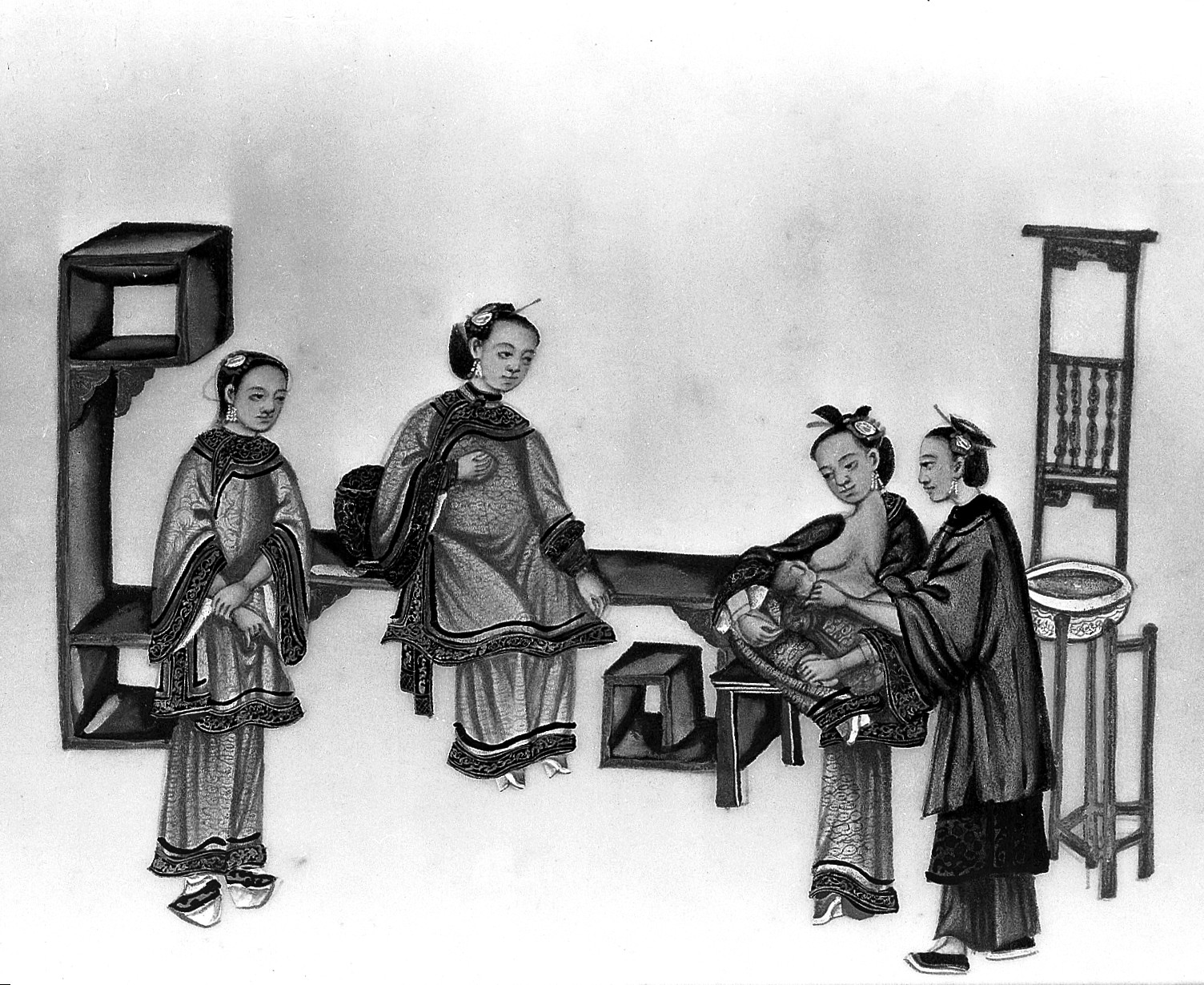
Chinese painting of a woman breastfeeding her baby, surrounded by supporters

Postpartum confinement is well-documented in China, where the tradition is known as "Sitting the month": 坐月子 "Zuò yuè zi" in Mandarin or 坐月 "Co5 Jyut2" in Cantonese. The earliest record of the Chinese custom of postpartum confinement dates back over 2,000 years ago in the Book of Rites, where it was known as yuè nèi (月内). Postpartum confinement is based on traditional Chinese medicine, with a special focus on eating foods considered to be nourishing for the body and helping with the production of breastmilk. Women are advised to stay indoors for recovery from the trauma of birth and for feeding the newborn baby.

The diets and traditions involved with postpartum confinement greatly vary across different Chinese cultural regions. The length of Chinese postpartum confinement ranges anywhere between 28 and 100 days. Medical opinion in China today generally recommends a confinement period of at least 42 days. In ancient China, the confinement period lasted for 100 days. This custom is still observed in parts of northern China, such as Shanxi province. After 100 days, the Hundred Days Banquet (百日宴) is held to celebrate the baby reaching 100 days old. In southern China, the confinement period is significantly shorter, and usually lasts 30 days.

Because Chinese society is patrilocal, women observing postpartum confinement are traditionally cared for by their mother-in-law. In contemporary times, it is also possible for the woman to be cared for her by her own mother or a hired female worker known as a "confinement nanny" (陪月). In Hong Kong, the mother and baby sometimes spend the month in special postpartum confinement clinics rather than at home.

In ancient China, women of certain ethnic groups in the South would resume work right after birth, and allow the men to practice postpartum confinement instead. (See Couvade).

==== Everyday habits and personal hygiene practices ====
Traditionally in China, the mother and child were kept separate from the rest of the household. The mother was not permitted to bathe, wash her hair, or weep, because these activities were believed to put the mother at risk of falling ill by catching cold and affect the quality of her breast milk.

Nowadays, however, new mothers may wash their hair or take a bath or shower infrequently during the postpartum period, but it is claimed to be important to dry their body immediately afterwards with a clean towel and their hair properly using a hair dryer. It is also claimed to be important for women to wrap up warm and minimize the amount of skin exposed, as it was believed that they may catch a cold during this vulnerable time. In Dalian, some women even take to wrapping themselves in plastic to avoid the wind.

===== Special foods =====
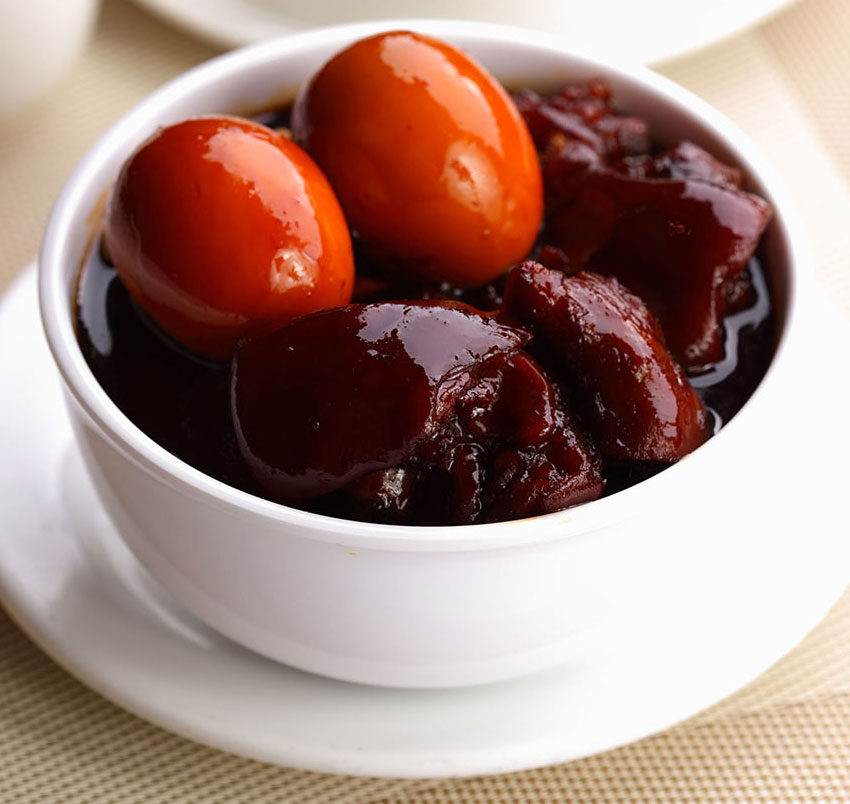
Pork knuckle with ginger and black vinegar

The custom of confinement advises new mothers to choose energy and protein-rich foods to recover energy levels, help shrink the uterus, and for the perineum to heal. This is also important for the production of breastmilk. Among the traditionally recommended galactogogues were rich porridge, fish soup, and hard-boiled eggs. Sometimes, new mothers only begin to consume special herbal foods after all the lochia is discharged.

A custom is to eat ginger. In Guangdong, a common dish is pork knuckles with ginger and black vinegar as pork knuckles are believed to help replenish calcium levels in women. Ginger is featured in many dishes, as it is believed that it can remove the 'wind' accumulated in the body during pregnancy. Meat-based soup broths are also commonly consumed to provide hydration and added nutrients.

In Shanxi, new mothers consume high-quality millet porridge and soup made from chickens at specific ages.

In Singapore, confinement dishes are thoughtfully crafted to support postpartum recovery. Sesame Oil Chicken helps replenish blood and keep the body warm, while Green Papaya Soup is known to boost breast milk supply. Red Dates Tea restores vitality and maintains warmth, and Black Vinegar Pig Trotters provide calcium and collagen to strengthen bones and joints.

===== Rituals =====
In Guangdong province, new mothers are barred from visitors until the baby is 12 days old, marked by a celebration called 'Twelve mornings' (known as 十二朝). From this day onwards, Cantonese families with a new baby usually share their joy through giving away food gifts, while some families mark the occasion by paying tribute to their ancestors. When the "month is fulfilled" (manyue) after 30 days, the mother receives relatives and friends who bring special foods such as Chinese red eggs.

==== Indian subcontinent ====
In parts of India it is called jaappa (also transliterated japa); in North India and Pakistan, sawa mahina ("five weeks").

Most traditional Indians follow the 40-day confinement and recuperation period also known as the jaappa (in Hindi). A special diet to facilitate milk production and increase hemoglobin levels is followed. Sex is not allowed during this time. In Hindu culture, this time after childbirth was traditionally considered a period of relative impurity (asaucham), and a period of confinement of 10–40 days (known as purudu) was recommended for the mother and the baby. During this period, she was exempted from usual household chores and religious rites. The father was purified by a ritual bath before visiting the mother in confinement.

In the event of a stillbirth, the period of impurity for both parents was 24 hours.

Many Indian subcultures have their own traditions after birth. This birth period is called Virdi (Marathi), which lasts for 10 days after birth and includes complete abstinence from puja or temple visits.

In Pakistan, postpartum tradition is known as sawa mahina ("five weeks").

==== Iran ====
In Persian culture it is called chilla, i.e. "forty days".

==== Japan ====
In Japan, the traditional postpartum practice is known as satogaeri bunben (里帰り分娩, "homecoming birth"). In this custom, a pregnant woman returns to her parents' home in the late stages of pregnancy to give birth and recover, typically staying for one to two months after delivery. The new mother's own mother provides practical support including meals, household tasks, and newborn care assistance.

Unlike Chinese zuo yue zi or Korean sanhujori, Japanese postpartum care does not typically involve codified dietary restrictions based on traditional medicine or strict prohibitions on bathing or exposure to cold. Instead, the emphasis is on practical and emotional support from the maternal family.

A study examining the relationship between satogaeri bunben and postnatal depression found that the practice itself did not significantly reduce the incidence of postpartum depression, suggesting that the type and quality of support received may matter more than the setting. A subsequent single-center analysis similarly found no significant difference in postpartum depressive status based on the presence of grandparents or the place of delivery.

==== Korea ====
In Korea, the traditional postpartum practice is known as sanhujori (산후조리), and women historically observed a confinement period called samchil-il (삼칠일, "three seven days," or 21 days). In the past, during the samchil-il period, geumjul (taboo rope) made with saekki and various symbolic objects, such as chili peppers (for a boy) and coal (for a girl), was hung over the gate to denote the childbirth and restrict visitor access.

Sanhujori practices traditionally include consuming warm foods believed to aid recovery, such as seaweed soup (miyeokguk), which is rich in iron and iodine and is considered essential for postpartum mothers. New mothers are also encouraged to keep warm, rest extensively, and avoid cold foods and environments.

Since the late 20th century, South Korea has seen the widespread establishment of specialized postpartum care facilities known as sanhujoriwon (산후조리원). These centers provide professional nursing care, newborn monitoring, lactation support, and traditional postpartum meals in a residential setting, typically for a stay of approximately two weeks. A 2023 study examining first-time mothers' satisfaction with sanhujoriwon found that both individual factors and environmental ecological factors influenced maternal satisfaction with these facilities.

The growth of sanhujoriwon parallels the development of postpartum care centers in Taiwan, reflecting a broader East Asian trend toward institutionalized postpartum recovery support.

==== Taiwan ====
Postpartum confinement is widely practiced in Taiwan, where it is commonly known as 做月內 (Tâi-lô: tsò-gue̍h-lāi). While the practice shares historical roots with broader East Asian postpartum traditions, postpartum confinement in Taiwan has developed its own distinct forms shaped by local medical culture, social structures, and modern healthcare systems. In Taiwan, postpartum confinement is understood as a period of structured recovery for both the mother and newborn, combining traditional beliefs with contemporary medical advice.

Unlike in China, postpartum confinement in Taiwan is strongly integrated into the modern healthcare system. Since the late 20th century, Taiwan has seen the rapid growth of specialized postpartum care centers (產後護理之家), which are licensed medical facilities regulated by the Ministry of Health and Welfare. These centers provide professional nursing care, lactation support, neonatal monitoring, and nutritionally planned confinement meals, allowing new mothers to observe confinement outside the home. This institutionalized model has become a defining feature of Taiwanese postpartum confinement and is far less common in China.

The typical confinement period in Taiwan lasts approximately 30 to 40 days, aligning closely with medical recommendations for postpartum recovery. While some families may extend the period based on personal or familial beliefs, extended confinements of 100 days—historically documented in parts of China—are uncommon in contemporary Taiwanese practice. Taiwanese medical professionals generally emphasize flexibility, maternal comfort, and evidence-based care over strict ritual observance.

===== Caregivers and living arrangements =====
Traditionally, postpartum women in Taiwan were cared for by female relatives, particularly their mothers or mothers-in-law. However, changing family structures, lower fertility rates, and increased urbanization have led to a decline in multigenerational households. As a result, many families now rely on professional confinement nannies (月嫂) or postpartum care centers rather than extended family members. This shift has reduced the hierarchical dynamics historically associated with patrilocal caregiving and reflects broader social changes in Taiwanese society.

===== Everyday practices and hygiene =====
Traditional Taiwanese confinement customs emphasized keeping the mother warm and limiting exposure to wind, echoing humoral concepts shared across East Asia. In earlier generations, bathing and hair washing were discouraged. In modern Taiwan, however, these restrictions have largely been relaxed. Mothers are generally permitted to shower and wash their hair during confinement, provided that they maintain warmth and dry thoroughly afterward.

===== Diet and confinement foods =====
Diet plays a central role in Taiwanese postpartum confinement, with an emphasis on warmth, nourishment, and recovery rather than strict prohibitions. A defining feature of Taiwanese confinement cuisine is the extensive use of sesame oil, rice wine, and ginger. One of the most iconic dishes is sesame oil chicken, sio-tsiú-ke and ginger duck, which is commonly consumed throughout the confinement period. Other frequently served foods include liver dishes, fish soup, herbal broths, and rice wine-based meals, which are believed to support blood replenishment and uterine recovery.

Unlike in China, Taiwanese confinement diets are often carefully calibrated by dietitians, especially in postpartum care centers, to balance traditional principles with modern nutritional science. Alcohol content in rice wine-based dishes is frequently reduced or cooked off, particularly for breastfeeding mothers.

===== Contemporary perspectives =====
In Taiwan today, postpartum confinement is generally framed as a form of maternal care rather than a rigid cultural obligation. Public discourse increasingly emphasizes maternal autonomy, mental health, and informed choice. While many Taiwanese families continue to value confinement as an important recovery period, adherence to specific rules varies widely based on personal preference, medical advice, and socioeconomic factors. Distinct from ancient Chinese practices, Taiwanese postpartum confinement represents a localized and evolving tradition that is characterized by medical institutionalization, dietary specialization, and a hybrid approach that integrates tradition with modern healthcare norms.

==== Thailand ====
New mothers used to be encouraged to lie in a warm bed near the fire for 30 days, a practice known as yu fai. This has been adapted into a form of Thai massage. Kao krachome is a type of herbal medicine in which the steam from the boiled plants is inhaled. Ya dong involves herbal medicine taken internally. Thai immigrants to Sweden report using the steam bath to heal after childbirth, although the correct ingredients are not easy to find. Thai Australians who had had caesarian sections felt that they did not need to – in fact, ought not to – undergo these rituals.

==== Malaysia ====
In Malaysia, postpartum confinement is practiced across ethnic Malay, Chinese, and Indian communities, each with distinct traditions. Malay mothers typically observe a 44-day confinement period, during which they undergo traditional practices including bertungku (application of a heated stone to the abdomen) and traditional massage (urut). Special herbal baths are also common throughout the recovery period. A comparative study of confinement practices in Singapore found that Chinese and Indian mothers tended to follow more specific dietary regimens than Malay mothers, and that Chinese mothers were more likely to depend on confinement nannies for support.

==== Vietnam ====
Vietnamese postpartum confinement traditions emphasize keeping the mother warm to avoid gio (wind), which is believed to cause headaches, joint pain, and other long-term ailments. New mothers are encouraged to stay warm, avoid cold water and drafts, and consume warming foods and herbal preparations. A 2021 meta-ethnography examining postpartum practices among Southeast and East Asian immigrant mothers found that Vietnamese women, along with Chinese, Korean, and Hmong women, frequently adapted their traditional confinement practices when living abroad, negotiating between cultural expectations and the realities of their new environments.

=== Europe ===
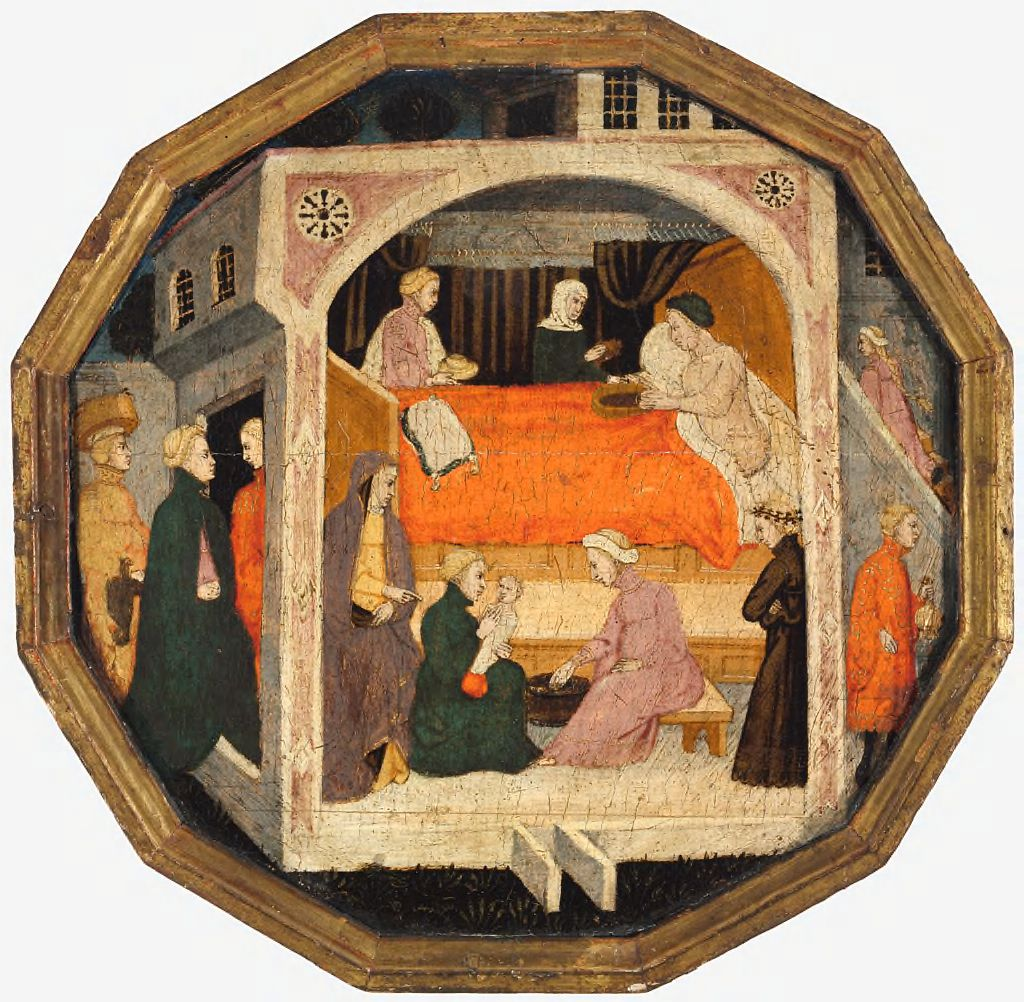
A mother in Florence lying-in, from a painted desco da parto or birth tray of c. 1410. As women tend to the child, expensively dressed female guests are already arriving.

The term used in English, now old-fashioned or archaic, was once used to name maternity hospitals, for example the General Lying-In Hospital in London. A 1932 Canadian publication refers to lying-in as ranging from two weeks to two months. These weeks ended with the re-introduction of the mother to the community in the Christian ceremony of the churching of women.

Lying-in features in Christian art, notably Birth of Jesus paintings. One of the gifts presented to the new mother in Renaissance Florence was a desco da parto, a special form of painted tray. Equivalent presents in contemporary culture include baby showers and push presents.

Special foods included caudle, a restorative drink. "Taking caudle" was a metonym for postpartum social visits.

=== Americas ===
==== Latin America ====
In Latin American countries, it is called la cuarentena ("forty days," a cognate with the English word "quarantine"). It is practised in parts of Latin America and amongst in communities in the United States. It is described as "intergenerational family ritual that facilitated adaptation to parenthood", including some paternal role reversal.

== Diaspora and immigrant experiences ==
Immigrant mothers from East and Southeast Asian cultures often seek to maintain postpartum confinement practices after relocating to Western countries, though they may face challenges in doing so. A 2021 meta-ethnography of eight studies involving Vietnamese, Chinese, Taiwanese, Korean, and Hmong immigrant mothers found that women frequently adapted confinement practices to their new environments, negotiating between traditional expectations and the realities of life abroad.

Challenges documented in the literature include difficulty accessing traditional confinement foods and herbal remedies, lack of extended family support that would traditionally be available in the home country, and cultural misunderstandings with Western healthcare providers unfamiliar with confinement customs. A 2024 qualitative study of Chinese immigrant mothers in Switzerland found that the postpartum period involved constructing new social support networks to replace the extended family structures that would traditionally provide confinement care.

In the United States and other Western countries, the growth of confinement nanny agencies and specialized postpartum care services catering to Asian immigrant communities reflects the demand for traditional postpartum support in a diaspora context. Similarly, sanhujoriwon-style postpartum retreat centers have begun appearing outside South Korea and Taiwan to serve overseas Korean and Chinese communities.

== See also ==
- Postpartum care
- Maternal bond and Attachment theory
- Culture and menstruation, including places and times of seclusion
- Impurity after childbirth
- Grandmother hypothesis
- Women-only space
- Wet nurse
- Parental investment in humans
- Sex after childbirth
