= Upstairs cafés in Hong Kong =

Cafés in Hong Kong

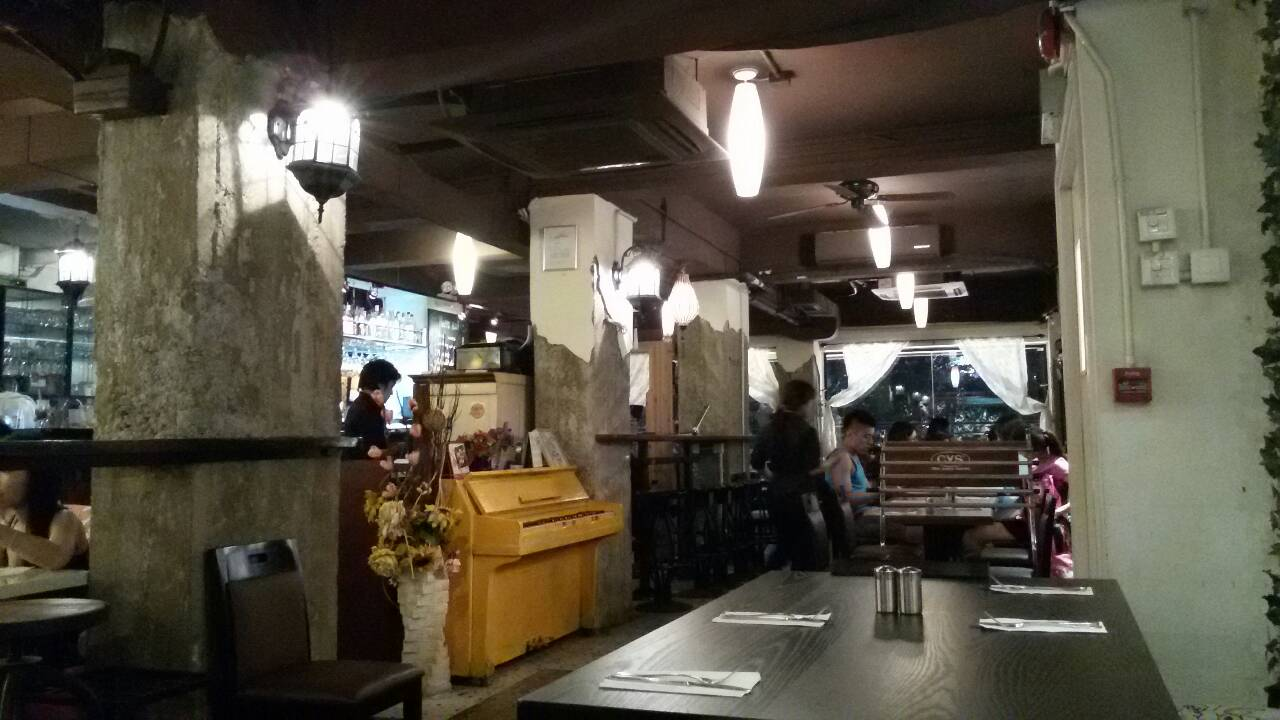
Upstairs café with garden theme

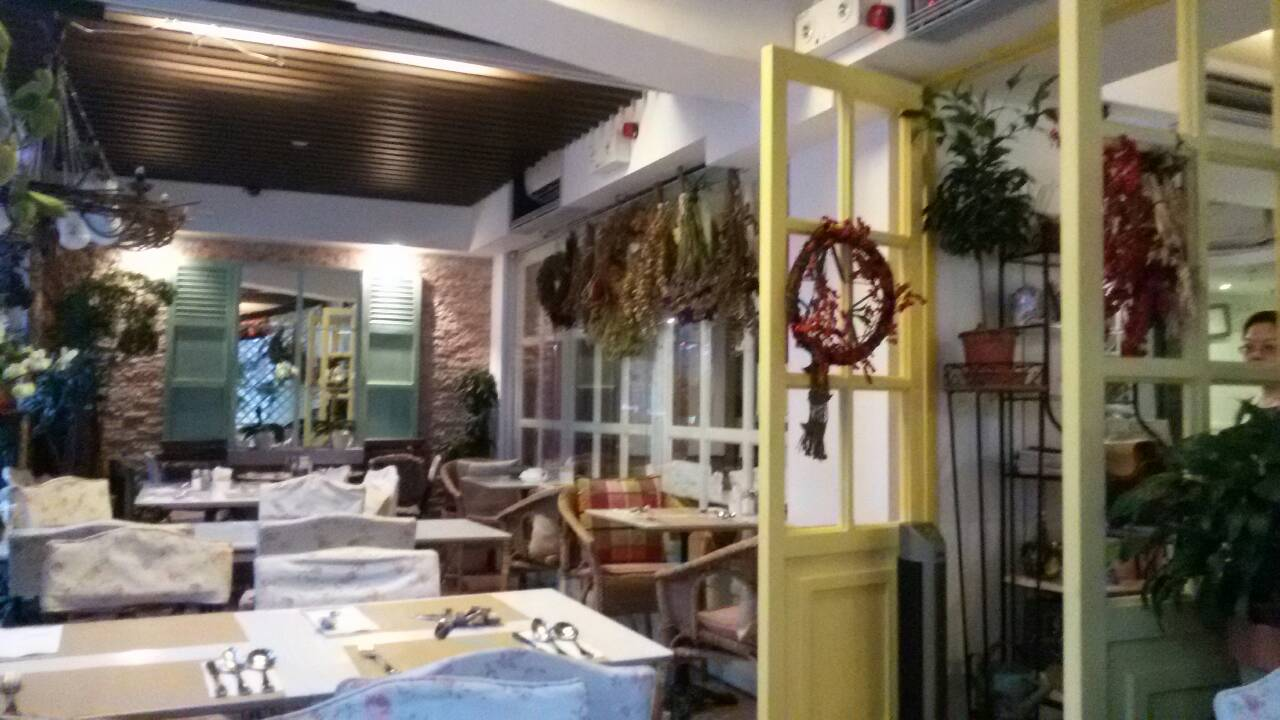
Interior of an upstairs café

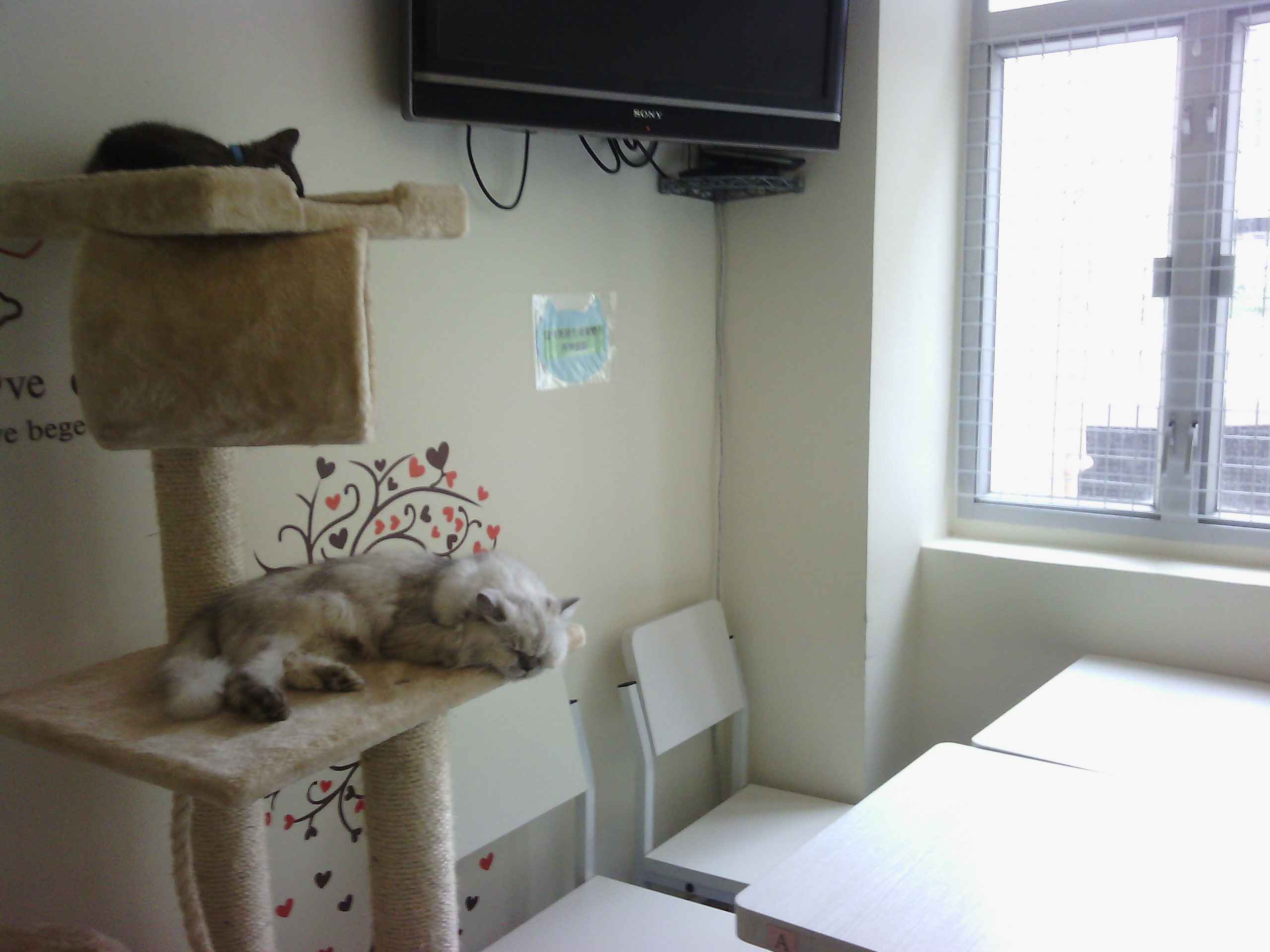
Cat café in Hong Kong

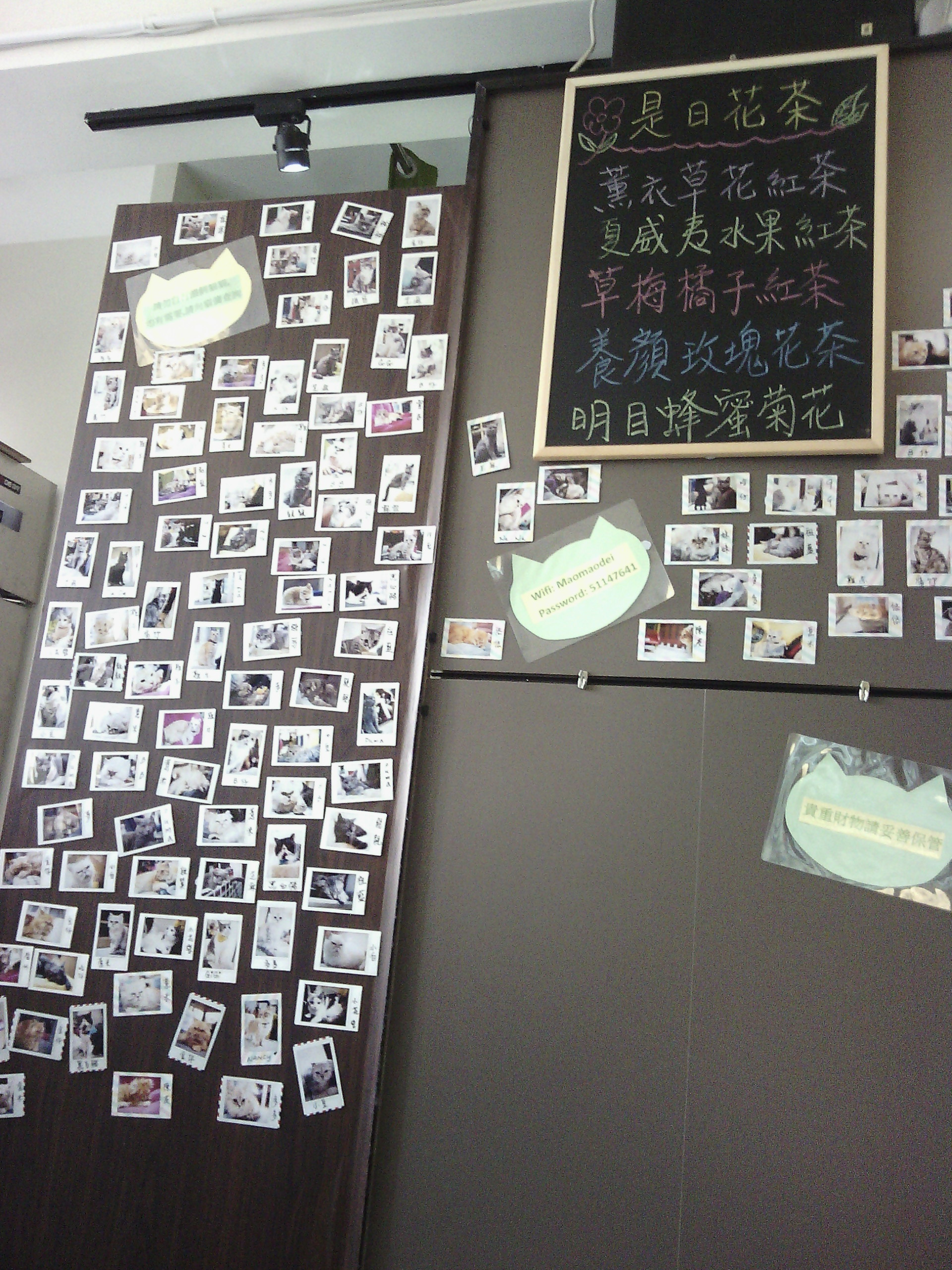
Cat café in Hong Kong

Upstairs cafés (Chinese: 樓上cafe) are cafés in Hong Kong that are located above street level. They became popular in the early 2000s and are mainly located in the upper floors of old commercial and mixed residential/commercial buildings in districts such as Mong Kok, Tsim Sha Tsui and Causeway Bay. Hong Kong’s dining guide websites such as OpenRice have a dedicated classification for these types of catering outlets.

Most of them have themed decorations such as pets, teddy bears, manga, or classrooms. Apart from food and drinks, many upstairs cafés in Hong Kong also provide free entertainment for customers such as Jenga, card games, chess sets and board games. Customers of upstairs cafés sometimes reserve the entire outlet for parties and gatherings due to the lower price point compared to restaurants at street level. Upstairs cafés are typically small businesses and are usually unadvertised and located in unmarked buildings in Hong Kong. As they are far from the dining outlets on the streets which have high visibility, it can be difficult for people to know of their the existence. People in Hong Kong usually learn about upstairs cafés from their friends, magazine articles, catering guide websites, or online blogs and forums.

== Reasons for existence ==
Due to Hong Kong's land shortage, retail rents in Hong Kong are constantly rising. According to property consultant CB Richard Ellis (CBRE), Hong Kong placed second with an average rent of US$1,695 per square foot per year in the report on global retail rents in the third quarter of 2011. Entrepreneurs of upstairs cafés choose the upstairs locations to avoid the high rents charged for ground-floor spaces.

As Hong Kong is a densely populated city, there are limited affordable public spaces for its people to gather for leisure.

Upstairs cafés often have marketing strategies to compete with chain competitors in Hong Kong such as Starbucks and Pacific Coffee Company. Many upstairs cafes have their own themes to make themselves stand out.

== Relation to Hong Kong youth culture ==
Upstairs cafés are one of the common leisure spots for youngsters in Hong Kong. Their popularity comes from the uniqueness of different cafés. They usually have specific thematic concepts, ranging from providing board games to providing book loaning services to their customers. The wide variety of upstairs cafés have attracted many teenagers.

Upstairs cafés also provide business opportunities for young entrepreneurs.

"Lazy" is one of the traits that media often uses when describing Hong Kong post-1990s, regarding people born after the year of 1990. One of the claimed reasons is that they enjoy doing nothing. The popping up of more cafés in Hong Kong is partially related to this phenomenon, as young people in Hong Kong would seemingly rather spend hours in these upstairs cafés chatting with friends, rather than go for a hike on a sunny day. Besides, youngsters in Hong Kong are often living in packed houses, due to the overloaded population and lack of housing in Hong Kong. So these upstairs cafés also provide a common area for friend gatherings since crowded houses in Hong Kong may not be suitable for group of friends to play together.

== Unlicensed upstairs cafés ==
Many upstairs cafés are unlicensed. The Food and Environmental Hygiene Department only has 200 inspectors who are responsible for inspecting the restaurants. Without receiving any complaints, it is difficult to uncover unlicensed cafés located in different buildings and different districts. Without licenses, many safety problems may arise, such as food hygiene problems, lack of fire escape exits, and building structure problems. In addition, the quality of food and the hygiene of the environment may not be guaranteed.
