= Hong Kong Chefs Association =

- Traditional Chinese: 香港廚師協會
- Simplified Chinese: 香港厨师协会
Transcriptions
Standard Mandarin
- Hanyu Pinyin: Xiānggǎng Chúshī Xiéhuì
Yue: Cantonese
- Jyutping: hoeng1 gong2 cyu4 si1/eoi4 si1 hip3 wui6*2

Established in 1991, The Hong Kong Chefs Association (HKCA), is a professional association and resource for professional chefs in Hong Kong, and the only professional chefs organization in Hong Kong that is a member of, and recognized by, the World Association of Chefs Societies(WACS).

== Hong Kong Young Chefs Club ==
In early 2007, the HKCA Executive Committee fostered the formation of a separate daughter organization, the Hong Kong Young Chefs Club (HKYCC). The HKYCC was established to provide a similar but independent forum for culinary students and young professional chefs aged 18 to 25. The HKYCC is currently one of only four such groups that is recognized by WACS.

In June 2008 WACS President Gissur Gudmundsson appointed the Chairman of the HKYCC, Francis Lo, as a member of the WACS Board advising on future young chefs programs.

== Community outreach and charity activities ==
One of the primary missions of the HKCA is to provide active support to the local and international community with charitable efforts and community outreach. In addition to normal fundraising and donation for international disaster relief, it annually fields teams of chefs to compete in the Hong Chi Climbathon, provides judging and support for the Best Buddies Hong Kong Cookery Competitions, and on each International Chefs Day prepares two buffets for thousands of students of both the Hong Chi and Fu Hong societies.

Such charitable and community work has led The Hong Kong Council of Social Service to award the HKCA the Caring Organization status for 2007–2008.

== Competitions ==
The HKCA co-organizes and hosts several international culinary competitions including:

- Norway Seafood Competition
- California Strawberry Competition
- California Raisin Competition
- The Hong Kong International Culinary Classics

Aside from hosting competitions the HKCA consistently fields top teams in international culinary competitions. Some notable past events are:

- 1996 Culinary Olympics in Berlin, where the HKCA team took 1st Place in pastry 3rd place in hot food and 3rd place as overall national team.
- 2006 FHA Singapore The HKCA "Hot Tomato" team won both Gold and Best Gourmet Team. Team captain Angelo Mcdonnell went on to publish an award-winning cookbook titled Hot Tomatoes.
- 2007 Sapporo Snow Festival Hong Kong team wins Gold and Top Award.
- 2008 FHA Singapore, In an effort to promote diversity and equality, HKCA fielded Asia's first known all women's culinary team. The team took a gold medal and was First Runner Up in the Best Gourmet Team Challenge.
- 2008 Sapporo Snow Festival Hong Kong team is First Runner Up

== See also ==
- Culinary Arts
- American Culinary Federation
