= Childbirth-related post-traumatic stress disorder =

- Specialty: OB/GYN, psychiatry

Childbirth-related post-traumatic stress disorder (PTSD) is a psychological disorder that can develop in women who have recently given birth. There are over 140 million births that occur in the world annually. Up to 50% of women describe their childbirth experiences as "traumatic." This disorder can also affect men or partners who have observed a difficult birth. Its symptoms are not distinct from post-traumatic stress disorder (PTSD). It may also be called post-traumatic stress disorder following childbirth (PTSD-FC). Symptoms of childbirth-related PTSD include anxiety, flashbacks, and fear of losing one's child.

== Signs and symptoms ==
About 4.7% of mothers develop childbirth-related PTSD. Examples of symptoms of childbirth-related post-traumatic stress disorder include intrusive symptoms such as flashbacks and nightmares, as well as symptoms of avoidance (including amnesia for the whole or parts of the event), uncomfortable sexual intimacy, discomfort being touched, abstinence, fear of pregnancy, and avoidance of birth- and pregnancy-related issues. Symptoms of increasing emotional stress include sweating, trembling, irritability, and sleep disturbances.

Symptoms of paternal childbirth-related post-traumatic stress disorder include anxiety, or intense fear of losing either the child or their partner who is giving birth. This can lead to difficulties in the father-child connection.

Although there is much information about childbirth related PTSD within mothers, the data is representative of white mothers. Many Black, Latina, and Asian mothers described to experience obstetric racism following their traumatic birth experiences. The racism faced by POC mothers has led to an increase in medical mistrust and fear of undergo racism for future children. The mistrust and stress experienced further intensifies maternal disparities, leading to poorer health outcomes and discouragement from receiving prenatal and postnatal care.

== Cause ==
Giving birth can be traumatic in many different ways. Medical problems can result in interventions that can be frightening. The near death of a mother or baby, heavy bleeding, and emergency operations are examples of situations that can cause psychological trauma. Premature birth may be traumatic. Emotional difficulties in coping with the pain of childbirth can also cause psychological trauma. Lack of support, or insufficient coping strategies to deal with the pain are examples of situations that can cause psychological trauma. For some mothers, giving birth is a profound and monumental moment in their lives. Therefore, having complications and a painful experience can be discerned negatively.

However, even normal birth can be traumatic, and thus PTSD is diagnosed based on symptoms of the mother and not whether or not there were complications. Additionally, in the process of birth, medical professionals who are there to aid the birthing mother may need to examine and perform procedures in the genital regions. These examinations can directly impact the patient's overall emotional and physical well-being, thus contributing to symptoms of childbirth-related PTSD.

The following are correlated with PTSD:

- Medical complications before, during, or after childbirth:
  - Pregnancy complications
  - Emergency C-section
  - Instrumental delivery
  - Episiotomy
  - Severe pain during birth
  - Postpartum complications
  - Preterm labour
  - History of infertility
  - Inadequate care during labour
- Social, psychological, and other factors:
  - Unwanted pregnancy
  - Low socioeconomic status
  - Primiparous (first labour)
  - Parenting (infant caring) problems
  - Social support following childbirth
  - Cultural factors
  - History of mental health issues
  - Other life stressors

== Diagnosis ==
Childbirth-related PTSD is not a recognized diagnosis in the Diagnostic and Statistical Manual of Mental Disorders. Many women presenting with symptoms of PTSD after childbirth are misdiagnosed with postpartum depression or adjustment disorders. These diagnoses can lead to inadequate treatment. Having a traumatic childbirth experience is unrecognized amongst maternity services, due to a lack of knowledge regarding the well-being of women who are freshly postpartum.

== Treatment ==
Treatments for postpartum PTSD can include methods to normalize the feelings that can arise and alleviate anxiety. In some cases, medication such as antidepressants or anti-anxiety drugs can be prescribed to manage symptoms. Seeking emotional support from support systems can contribute to improvements in well-being as well. Mental health professionals can conduct comprehensive assessments and provide evidence-based therapies tailored to individual needs. These therapies include Cognitive Behavioral Therapy (CBT), Eye Movement Desensitization and Reprocessing (EMDR), Prolonged Exposure Therapy (PE), and Narrative Exposure Therapy (NET). These trauma-focused therapies can assist in reshaping thought patterns, processing memories, and reducing anxiety and avoidance behaviors. Upholding screening practices for risk factors that negatively impact mothers in their pregnancy and postpartum stages can improve support and welfare.

== Epidemiology ==
Prevalence of PTSD following normal childbirth in women (excluding stillbirth or major complications) is estimated to be between 2.8% and 5.6% at six weeks postpartum, with rates dropping to 1.5% at six months postpartum. Symptoms of PTSD are common following childbirth, with prevalence of 24–30.1% at six weeks, dropping to 13.6% at six months.

== See also ==
- Miscarriage
- Pain management during childbirth
- Miscarriage and mental illness
