= Brockington =

Brockington may refer to:

== People ==
- Blake Brockington (1996–2015), American trans man
- Darien Brockington, American singer
- Ian Brockington (born 1935), British cardiologist
- Izaiah Brockington (born 1999), American basketball player
- John Brockington (born 1948), American football player
- Leonard Brockington (1888–1966), Canadian lawyer

== Places ==
- Brockington, Saskatchewan
- Brockington College
