= Postpartum psychosis =

Psychosis beginning suddenly in the first two weeks after childbirth

- Other names: Puerperal psychosis
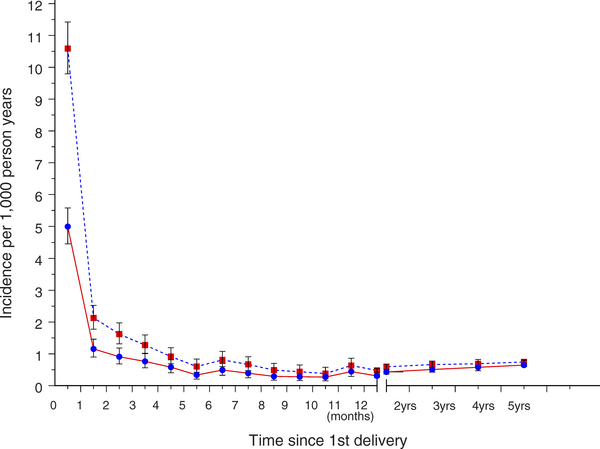
- Rates of psychoses among Swedish first-time mothers
- Specialty: Psychiatry
- Symptoms: Hallucinations, delusions, mood swings, confusion, restlessness, personality changes
- Causes: Genetic and environmental
- Risk factors: Family history, bipolar disorder, schizophrenia, difficult pregnancy
- Treatment: Antipsychotics, mood stabilizers, antidepressants
- Frequency: 0.005%

Postpartum psychosis (PPP), also known as puerperal psychosis or peripartum psychosis, involves the abrupt onset of psychotic symptoms shortly following childbirth, typically within two weeks of delivery. However, postpartum individuals are at risk for developing symptoms for several months after birth.

Symptoms may include delusions, hallucinations, disorganized speech (e.g., incoherent speech), or abnormal motor behavior (e.g., catatonia). Other symptoms frequently associated with PPP include confusion, disorganized thought, severe difficulty sleeping, variations of mood disorders (including depression, agitation, mania, or a combination of the above), as well as cognitive features such as consciousness that comes and goes (waxing and waning) or disorientation. Given the variety of symptoms associated with PPP, a thorough consideration of other psychiatric and non-psychiatric (or organic) causes must be ruled out through a combination of diagnostic labwork and imaging, as well as clinical presentation.

To document PPP within the DSM-5, the specifier "with perinatal onset" is used alongside a diagnosis such as "brief psychotic disorder" or "bipolar I disorder" if symptoms begin within 4 weeks of delivery. Recent literature suggests that the syndrome occurs in the context of known or new-onset bipolar illness, and some experts have recommended that PPP be classified as a distinct category within the bipolar disorders chapter of the DSM.

The cause of PPP is currently unknown, though growing evidence for the broad category of postpartum psychiatric disorders (e.g., postpartum depression) suggests hormonal and immune changes as potential factors contributing to their onset, as well as genetics and circadian rhythm disruption. There is no agreement in the evidence about risk factors, though a number of studies have suggested that sleep loss, first pregnancies (primiparity), and previous episodes of PPP may play a role. More recent reviews have added to growing evidence that prior psychiatric diagnoses, especially bipolar disorder, in the individual or their family may raise the risk of a new-onset psychosis triggered by childbirth. There are currently no screening or assessment tools available to diagnose PPP; a diagnosis must be made by the attending physician based on the patient's presenting symptoms, guided by diagnostic criteria in the DSM-5. Additionally, recent expert debate suggests that PPP may be better understood as a part of the bipolar spectrum triggered by childbirth, rather than solely a brief psychotic disorder specifier.

While PPP is seen only in one to two of every 1000 childbirths, the rapid development of psychotic symptoms, particularly those that include delusions of misidentification or paranoia, raises concerns for the safety of the patient and the infant; thus, PPP is considered a psychiatric emergency, usually requiring urgent hospitalization. Treatment may include medications such as benzodiazepines, lithium, and antipsychotics, as well as procedures such as electroconvulsive therapy (ECT). In some cases where pregnant those with a known history of bipolar disorder or previous episodes of PPP, prophylactic use of medication (especially lithium) either throughout or immediately after delivery has been demonstrated to reduce the incidence of psychotic or bipolar episodes in the postpartum period.

== Medical literature ==
=== Historical reports ===
Between the 16th and 18th centuries, about 50 brief reports regarding postpartum psychosis were published; among them is the observation that these psychoses could recur, and that they occur both in breast-feeding and non-lactating individuals. In 1797, Osiander, an obstetrician from Tübingen, reported two cases at length that contributed significantly to the knowledge of this disorder during that time. In 1819, Esquirol conducted a survey of cases admitted to the Salpêtrière, and pioneered long-term studies. From that time, puerperal psychosis became widely known to the medical profession. In the next 200 years, over 2,500 theses, articles and books were published. Among these many contributions were Delay's unique investigation using serial curettage and Kendell's record-linkage study comparing 2 years before and 2 years after the birth. In the last few years, two monographs reviewed over 2,400 works, detailing more than 4,000 cases of childbearing psychoses from the literature and a personal series of more than 320 cases. Postpartum psychosis has historically received less research attention compared to other psychiatric disorders, limiting its understanding, treatment, and long-term outcomes.

=== Modern medical literature ===
Postpartum psychosis was recognized in DSM I and II, first as Involutional Psychotic Reaction and later as Psychosis with Childbirth. It was removed in the DSMIII following arguments that psychiatric disorders associated with pregnancy and childbirth were no different than other psychiatric illnesses. it was recognized again with the 1994 release of the DSM-IV, when the specifier "with postpartum onset" was included for various diagnoses. In DSM-5, the specifier was renamed "with perinatal onset".

To document PPP within the DSM-5, "with perinatal onset" is used alongside a diagnosis such as "brief psychotic disorder" or "bipolar I disorder" if onset occurs within four weeks of childbirth. In the ICD-10, postpartum disorders are coded according to the presenting psychiatric disorder alongside a second code to denote puerperium onset, such as F53 if onset occurs within six weeks of childbirth. Because postpartum psychiatric disorders may present outside of these timeframes, the utility of these classifiers is limited.

== Signs and symptoms ==
PPP symptoms commonly occur within 2 weeks of birth, although postpartum individuals remain at risk of developing symptoms for several months postpartum. Episodes may last weeks to several months. A hallmark of PPP is rapidly changing presentation; symptoms can wax and wane over the course of hours. These fluctuations often confuse clinicians and family members.

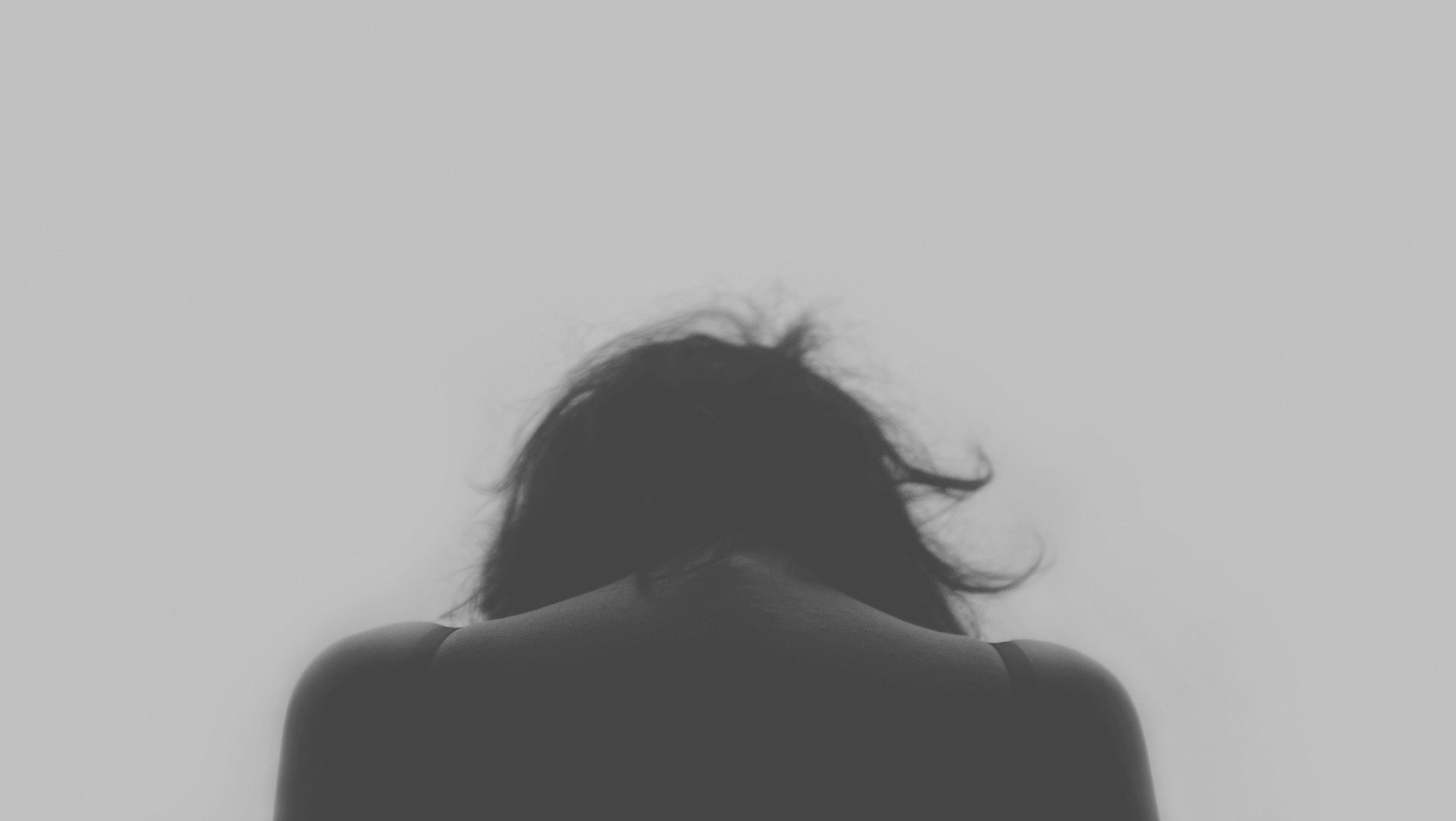
Depression, as well as other mood symptoms like mania and irritability, is a relatively common feature of postpartum psychosis.

Diagnostic criteria per the DSM-5 requires the presence of at least one psychotic symptom, defined as delusions, hallucinations, bizarre or incoherent speech (disorganized speech), or abnormal movements (psychomotor behavior) such as catatonia. Delusions, particularly about the infant, are the most commonly reported psychotic symptom associated with PPP.

Paranoid delusions are a frequently noted theme in cases of PPP, but a small review noted infrequent cases of delusional misidentification syndromes, such as Capgras syndrome (the belief that someone or something familiar has been replaced with an impostor), Fregoli syndrome (the belief that a stranger is actually a known person in disguise), and others. The latter types of delusions may have a significant negative impact on the bond between a parent and child, raising concerns for the safety of both. In addition, evidence suggests that emotion-recognition difficulties in those at risk for PPP may further impair parent-infant interaction quality and engagement.

Both postpartum obsessive–compulsive disorder (OCD) and PPP may present with concerning thoughts about the infant; typically, the thoughts associated with OCD are unwanted and distressing to the individual (who does not wish to act on their thoughts), whereas persons with PPP are often less distressed by their beliefs and may even feel the need to act on them. Compared to schizophrenia, PPP tends to feature less bizarre delusions, and associated hallucinations are more likely to be visual rather than auditory. The sensation of being outside one's body or feeling that one's surroundings are unreal (i.e., derealization) has also been described in cases of PPP. Additional distinctions in PPP compared to classical schizophrenia include the presence of mood and cognitive (or neurological) symptoms.

Rapid mood changes or the presence of unusual moods such as depression or mania (increased energy, decreased need for sleep, etc.) tend to be seen in a large percentage of patients experiencing PPP. Irritability, anxiety, and general difficulties with sleep may also be present. Confusion or disorientation, disorganized thoughts, incoherent speech, or abrupt changes in a person's mental capacity may also be seen in individuals experiencing PPP, though one small study observed these neurological symptoms in only one-quarter of PPP cases. Like delirium, these symptoms may come and go in unpredictable patterns.

Thoughts of committing suicide or harming one's infant or children have also been reported as common occurrences in PPP, with as many as half of PPP cases exhibiting these features. In many cases where harmful thoughts exist, the person experiencing these thoughts does not consider their intended action to be harmful; rather, they believe that their actions are in the best interest of the child.

== Risk factors ==
Childbirth is the primary cause of PPP; other causes and risk factors remain largely under investigation.

The largest known risks for the occurrence of PPP include a history of PPP in a previous pregnancy, or a personal or family history of bipolar disorder. A significant number of PPP cases, however, occur in individuals with no prior history of psychosis. (For this reason, first-time pregnancy is itself sometimes considered to be a risk factor for PPP.) A review of pregnancy-related complications demonstrated some association between emergency caesarean sections (C-sections), excess bleeding, uterine rupture, and stillbirth (amongst other complications) and the subsequent development of PPP; however, several of the reviewed studies were contradictory and thus no consensus can confirm the relationship between problems related to pregnancy and PPP. Additional research suggests that obstetric complications alone are unlikely to be a direct cause of PPP and may instead interact with underlying biological or psychological vulnerabilities.

Lifestyle and psychological factors, such as previous trauma or single parenthood, have likewise been inconclusive as factors contributing to PPP, though a number of patients have reported a perception that social and pregnancy-related challenges were the cause of their PPP episodes.

== Pathophysiology ==
Currently, the pathophysiology of PPP is not well understood and remains an open field of ongoing research. The leading theories under investigation involve areas of genetics, hormones, immunology, and sleep disturbance processes.

=== Genetics ===
Some findings suggest an association between PPP and variation in serotonin transporter genes and signaling or changes at specific chromosomes (e.g., 16p13 or METTL13). However, the majority of research devoted to genetic understanding of PPP has evaluated patients who have known bipolar disorder, so these associations may not be specific to PPP.

=== Hormones ===
Despite significant hormonal changes that occur around pregnancy and childbirth, there is little evidence supporting hormonal causes behind PPP. Changes in corticotropin-releasing hormone (CRH) and adrenocorticotropic hormone (ACTH), as well as rapid changes in estrogen and progesterone, are known effects associated with delivering a child, and they are present in both those affected and unaffected by PPP; therefore, a relationship between hormonal change and the onset of psychosis is not well-supported, though some researchers continue to explore whether postpartum disorders might be related to differences in sensitivity to rapid hormone changes. Estrogen has known impacts on various neurotransmitters, including serotonin and dopamine), which prominent theories associate with schizophrenia; however, investigations of estrogen concentrations and dopamine receptor sensitivity, and trials of estrogen replacement following birth, do not support an association between estrogen changes and PPP onset.

=== Immune system alteration ===
Due to above-average rates of PPP in individuals experiencing immunologic complications such as anti-N-methyl-D-aspartate (NMDA) receptor encephalitis and autoimmune thyroid disorders, as well as the known heightened immune response post-childbirth, some theories suggest a connection between PPP and the immune system. There is some evidence connecting PPP with changes to levels of peripheral immune cells (e.g., lymphocytes and NK or natural killer cells) traveling in the bloodstream, but more research is required to identify the specific mechanisms and cell types involved which might be related to PPP onset. No direct evidence has shown a link between cytokine levels and PPP.

=== Sleep disturbance ===
A link between sleep difficulty and PPP is not strongly supported by current evidence; however, some studies have demonstrated an increased risk for postpartum psychosis in individuals with bipolar disorder who have had manic episodes triggered by sleep disturbance (sleep disorder),

== Diagnosis ==
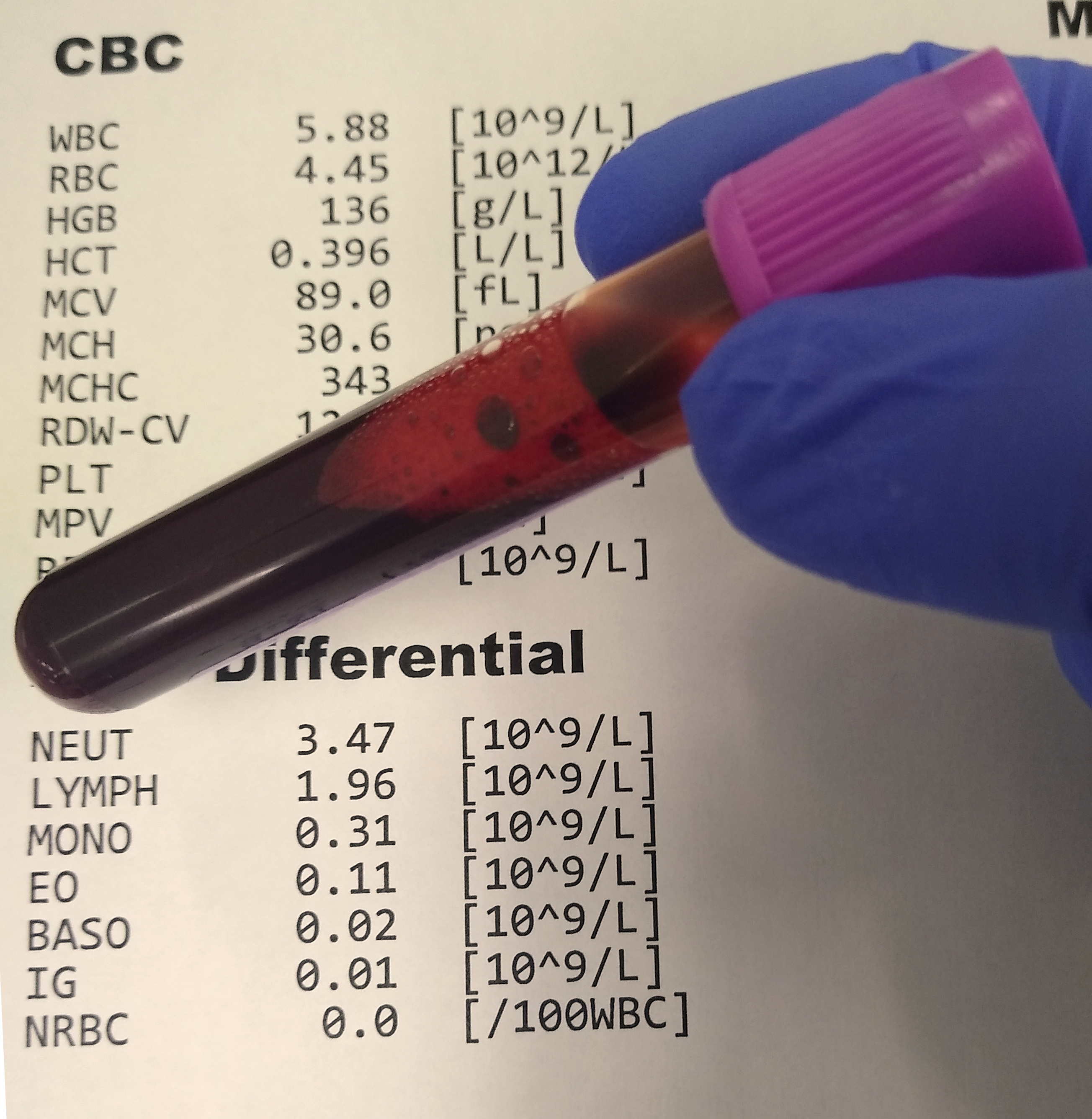
There are no tests designed to diagnose postpartum psychosis. A complete blood count, pictured above, may be part of the initial work-up to rule out other organic causes of psychotic symptoms.

There are no laboratory or imaging tools available to diagnose PPP, though a work-up of different laboratory analyses and imaging of the brain may be conducted to ensure other potential confounding diagnoses (e.g., vascular disorders, infective delirium, etc.) are not the cause of the patient's presentation. These may include, but are not limited to, a complete blood count, comprehensive metabolic panel, urinalysis and urine drug screen, and tests for thyroid functioning; further workup in the setting of classically neurological symptoms (such as delirium-like confusion) may include magnetic resonance imaging (MRI), a test of cerebrospinal fluid (CSF), or electroencephalogram (EEG).

=== Screening ===
Currently, no screening tools exist to evaluate for PPP, though providers may choose to use standard screens for postpartum depression and mania to evaluate the presence of these particular symptoms.

It may be difficult for providers and family-members to identify PPP, due to the presence of several symptoms that are classically associated with other postpartum conditions such as postpartum depression, as well as overlap with often-benign changes that accompany new parenthood (anxiety, irritability, poor sleep). Therefore, clinical recommendations advise healthcare providers to directly ask new parent's about thoughts of harming themselves or their children.

=== Differential ===
The presentation of PPP includes a large differential overlapping neurological and psychiatric diseases and syndromes. Neurological, or cognitive, symptoms like disorientation and confusion raise concerns for conditions that organically affect the brain: this may include autoimmune processes resulting in various forms of encephalitis, embolism (and other vascular disorders), and infectious processes. Physical causes as a result of chronic hormonal disease (e.g., thyroid diseases, hyperparathyroidism) or complications resulting from childbirth, such as Sheehan's syndrome or other complications resulting from excess blood loss, should also be evaluated. Other psychiatric conditions must also be considered: postpartum blues, postpartum depression, anxiety disorders, and postpartum OCD may have many overlapping symptoms with PPP. Finally, psychosis as a result of various substances (including medications such as steroids), should be ruled out. If this is a first-onset episode of psychosis, new-onset bipolar disorder and schizophrenia cannot be ruled out; the diagnosis of these disorders is based on time and recurrence of episodes.

== Treatment ==
While each case is considered by individual circumstances, generally, PPP is assessed as a psychiatric emergency and requires admission to a psychiatric hospital for close care. This admission may be to a parent-infant psychiatric unit or a general adult psychiatric unit, depending upon the availability in one's country and area. Birthing parent-baby psychiatric units are specialized inpatient settings designed to allow birthing parents to remain with their infants while receiving psychiatric treatment. These units support both the recovery of the affected parent and the developing birthing parent-infant relationship. Research indicates that these units are associated with improved maternal mental health outcomes, including lower rates of relapse compared to standard psychiatric hospitalization, and may be more cost-effective due to better long-term outcomes. Birthing parent-baby psychiatric units also promote parenting confidence and allow for clinical observation of birthing parent-infant interactions which may inform more tailored care. Because few units, especially in the United States, offer birthing parent-baby services, patients may be discharged home as soon as the worst concerns for the safety of the patient and infant are cleared, even though the patient may still be experiencing some symptoms of PPP; in this way, patients receive care to prevent harm to self and others but return home to care for their children and promote bonding as soon as they are able. birthing parent-baby psychiatric units, when available, allow this process to begin early, promoting recovery and positive breastfeeding outcomes.

Treatment plans are made up of a combination of education, medication, and close follow-up care and support; the major goals of care include improving sleep and psychotic symptoms while helping to minimize major shifts in mood, such as depression and mania. Medical treatment typically involves ECT, benzodiazepines, lithium, and/or antipsychotics.

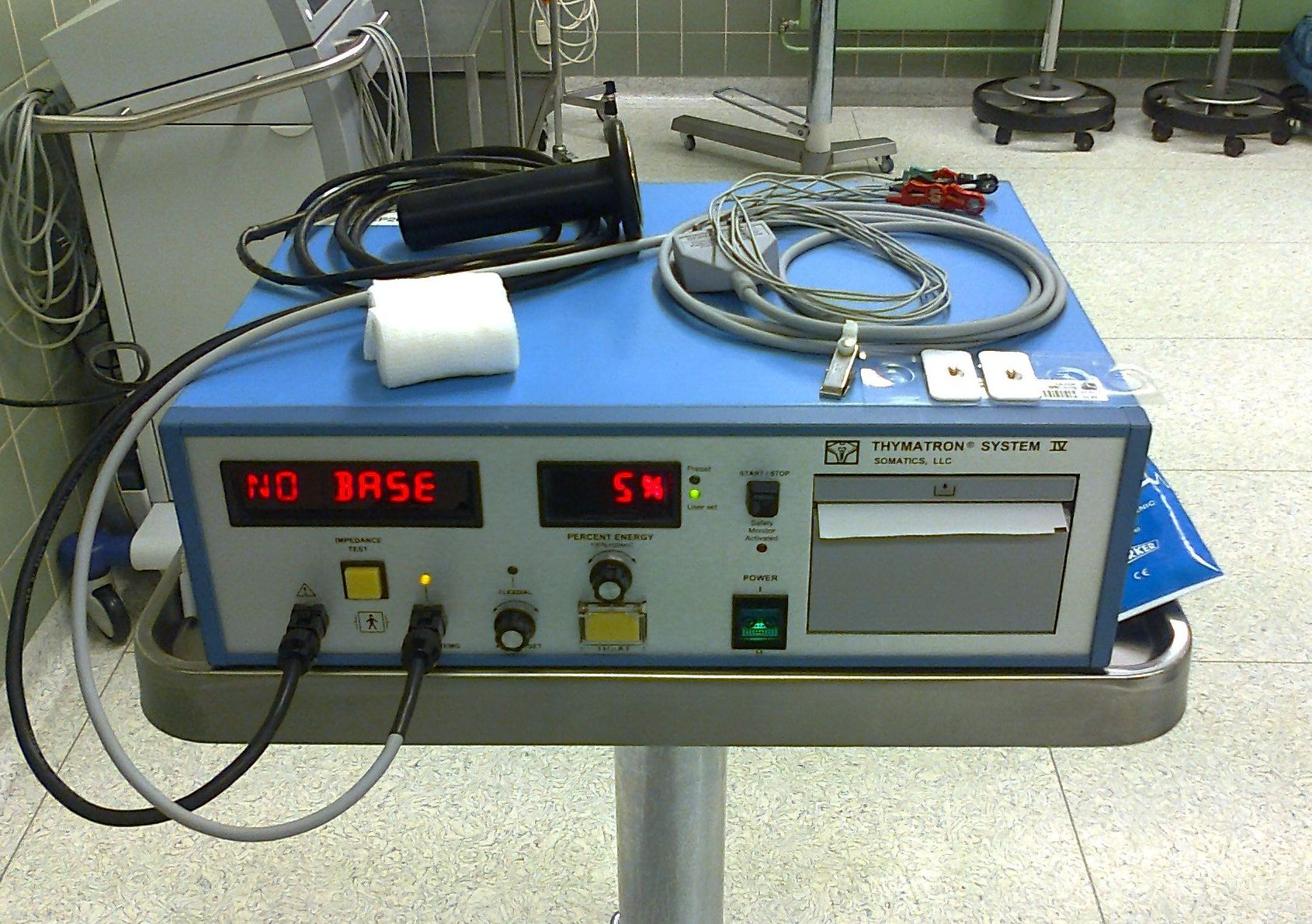
Electroconvulsive therapy (ECT) is one of the available treatments for postpartum psychosis.

=== Electroconvulsive therapy (ECT) ===
Electroconvulsive therapy (ECT) has a long and well-documented history as a psychiatric treatment, starting in 1938, with a large body of literature supporting its effectiveness and safety in various psychiatric conditions, including psychosis. However, while it has been used for PPP for over 50 years, the data on its efficacy in PPP specifically is limited to a significant number of case series and various retrospective matched-cohort studies. There are few adverse effects associated with ECT, though short-term memory disturbance (< 6 months) has been reported. Patients who are adverse to long-term psychiatric medications may prefer ECT, particularly given the minimal and short-term impact that ECT-related medications (e.g., drugs for muscle relaxation and anesthesia) appear to have on breastfeeding (as compared to psychiatric medications). Per current recommendations, ECT is considered an option for PPP when medications are ineffective.

=== Lithium ===
Lithium is a psychiatric medication commonly classified as a "mood stabilizer" and often used for the treatment of bipolar disorder. For PPP, lithium can be administered as a medication by itself ("monotherapy") or as an additional medication with other psychiatric drugs ("adjunctive therapy"). Research has shown strong evidence for the effectiveness of lithium as monotherapy in preventing repeat episodes of psychosis, particularly when compared to antipsychotic use alone, and current recommendations suggest it as a first-line treatment for PPP in patients for whom this is safe (lithium is not advised for patients with severe kidney or heart disease, thyroid dysfunction, Brugada syndrome, or who have known allergies to the drug). Lithium has been associated with side effects to the fetus when taken during pregnancy, including body and heart abnormalities (e.g., Ebstein's anomaly); these effects have been documented in all trimesters, but higher risks, particularly for structural heart problems and spontaneous abortion, are typically seen with exposure in the first trimester.

Lithium is also currently the recommended medication for prevention of psychotic episodes in individuals who have a known history of bipolar disorder and/or previous episodes of PPP. The preferred strategy for preventative medication is to begin lithium immediately following delivery of the infant, minimizing the exposure of the fetus to lithium while in the womb. Treatment throughout pregnancy, however, may be warranted as appropriate for treatment of bipolar disorder, and is dosed according to appropriate medical advisory for the patient's trimester. Lithium effectiveness is based on reaching an optimum level in the individual's blood, which usually requires more frequent bloodwork and adjustment of medication dosage to find and maintain an appropriate level. Stopping lithium requires slow and gradual discontinuation; sudden removal of the medication may lead to symptom relapse and suicidal thoughts.

=== Benzodiazepines ===
Benzodiazepines are a class of drug commonly used for anxiety disorders and insomnia, though they also play a role as an additive medication for psychosis and delirium. According to a small study of 64 women, benzodiazepines had a minor but positive effect in reducing psychosis as a sequentially added medication for treatment of PPP (on top of lithium and antipsychotic medications); due to little supporting data, benzodiazepines are currently only recommended as an add-on medication to lithium and/or antipsychotic drugs, usually in the setting of continued sleep disturbance despite the use of the other medications.

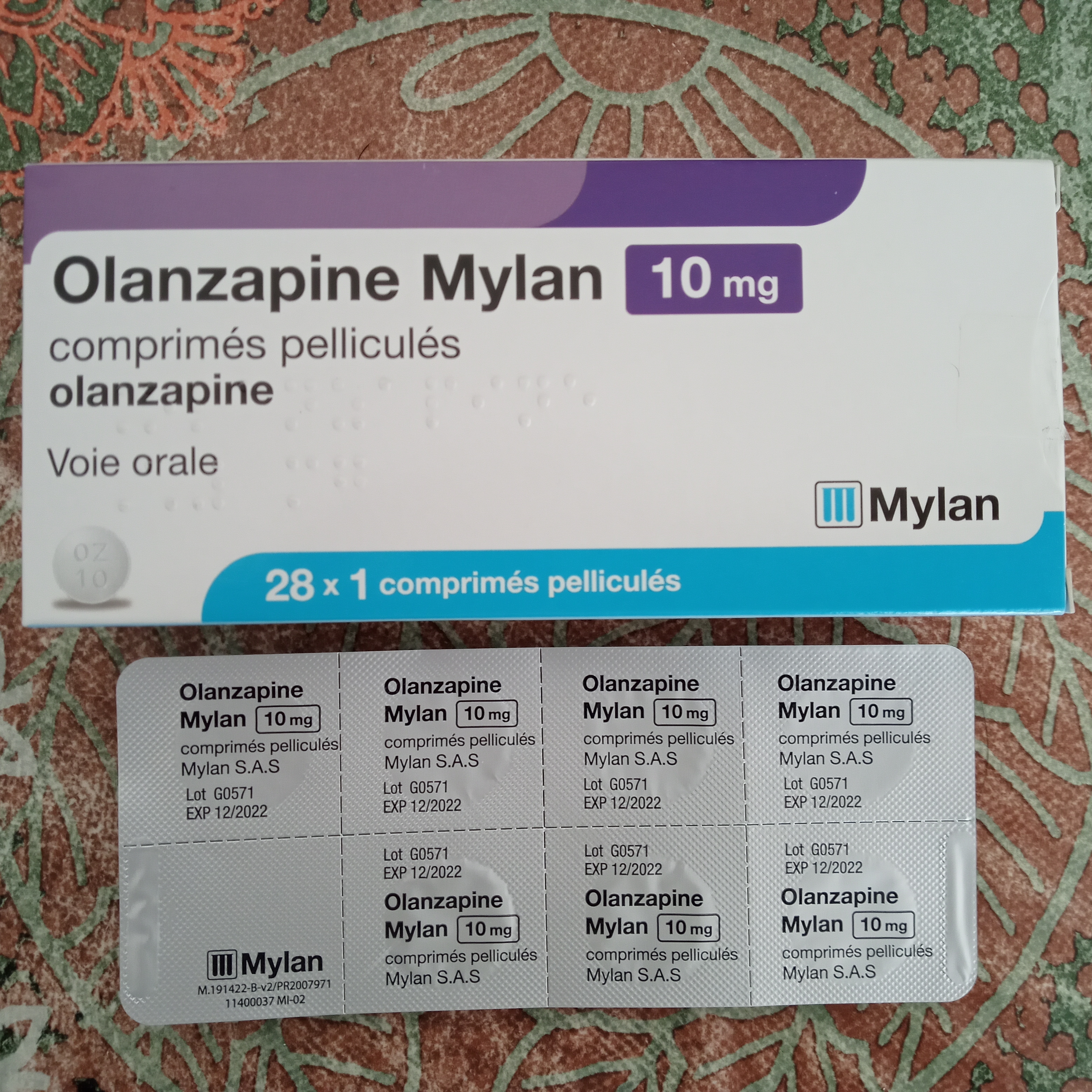
Olanzapine (Zyprexa), a second-generation antipsychotic medication that may be prescribed for postpartum psychosis

=== Antipsychotics ===
Antipsychotic medications are the preferred class of drug used to treat general psychosis, including schizophrenia spectrum disorders. Few studies provide evidence for the efficacy of antipsychotic use in PPP, with the exception of one study of 64 women which examined antipsychotic use as a drug by itself and combined with lithium. In this study, antipsychotic use was effective in both scenarios, but not as effective as lithium used by itself. Despite this limited evidence in PPP specifically, current recommendations include antipsychotic use as an additional medication for patients receiving lithium, or antipsychotic use on its own for those who are unable to tolerate lithium.

Antipsychotic choice is physician- and case-dependent, with a large number of available medications offering a range of nuanced effects. Treatment guidance is largely based on recommendations and data from patients with schizophrenia who become pregnant. First-generation antipsychotics have a longer history of use, efficacy and safety in pregnancy, particularly chlorpromazine and haloperidol. Still, second-generation antipsychotics may be preferred over first-generation antipsychotics due to the reduced risk for extrapyramidal symptoms (e.g., uncontrollable movements, tremors or muscle contractions).

=== Treatment and breastfeeding ===
Disruption of continued contact with the infant may occur during hospitalization and treatment, which may impact breastfeeding capacity; hospital units may provide the use of a breast pump to mitigate this concern. Strategies and concerns should also be discussed regarding breastfeeding and its impact on sleep, as poor sleep related to night feedings may worsen or delay patient recovery; alternatives may include social support and bottle-feeding through the night to allow the patient time for adequate rest. Additionally, research suggests that maternal-infant separation during psychiatric hospitalization can increase maternal psychological distress, leading to more negative outcomes for both parent and baby. Birthing parent-baby psychiatric accommodations may support allowing continued contact between the postpartum parent and infant during treatment, overall supporting bonding and breastfeeding outcomes.

The effects of various medications during breastfeeding are poorly studied. According to one systematic review evaluating 37 different reports of antipsychotic use in 206 infants, olanzapine has the strongest supporting evidence for low infant exposure through breastmilk, while fewer reports support a similarly low exposure for quetiapine and ziprasidone use. Chlorpromazine also demonstrates minimal transference to the infant through breastmilk.

There is currently no consensus to the safety or level of lithium present in breastmilk, though several guidelines and reviews do not consider it an absolute danger to the infant which should exclude its use. Several reports describe safe use of lithium during breastfeeding with no noticeable effects in the infant, though any lasting effects have not been well-studied. As in adults, lithium use with breastfeeding infants requires careful monitoring of the child for serum levels, dose adjustment, and any side effects; thus, the ability of the patient to maintain follow-up care should also be taken into consideration when lithium may be used.

Short-acting benzodiazepines, like lorazepam, are preferred from this class of drugs as they demonstrate lower levels passed through breastmilk and no reported side effects in infants.

Significant barriers and stigmas continue to limit access to appropriate care for people experiencing PPP. Fear of judgement, concerns about child custody, and an overall lack of awareness of PPP can significantly delay help-seeking behaviors and prevent interventions which are considered timely. Additionally, limited availability of birthing parent-baby specialized psychiatric units contributes to the restriction of sufficient care. Together, barriers and stigmas surrounding PPP limit positive outcomes to those experiencing PPP.

=== Psychosocial Approaches ===
Clinical psychologist Marie Brown argues that contemporary mainstream approaches to the treatment and understanding of postpartum psychosis rely too heavily on biomedical frameworks at the expense of psychological, feminist, and meaning-oriented approaches. Her work suggests the over emphasis of risk as forestalling more humane and person-centered treatment for women experiencing postpartum psychosis.

== Prognosis ==
Symptoms may last for a variable length of time (up to one year in 25% of cases) despite adequate treatment. Despite most individuals (50-80%) experiencing a relapse episode and development of chronic psychiatric disorders (such as bipolar spectrum disorder), these same individuals are expected to be able to resume normal activities of their daily life with the same level of function as previously experienced.

Of the minority of persons who experience PPP and choose to have another pregnancy, evidence has shown that about 33% will have a repeat psychotic episode. Other factors that contribute to poorer prognosis include an experience of PPP that's limited to the postpartum period (rather than a diagnosis of bipolar disorder, for example), longer initial psychotic episodes, and a higher severity in the initial episode.

Infanticide (or filicide) is thought to occur in 1 to 4% of PPP cases, and some evidence suggests that these incidents are more commonly related to PPP episodes that feature more depressive symptoms.

== Epidemiology ==
PPP is rare, reported to occur in about 1 to 2 of every 1000 childbirths (0.9 to 2.6 per 1,000). Reported cases are thought to underestimate the actual occurrence of PPP due to the probability of some individuals avoiding hospitalized care to avoid separation from their child (particularly in locations with no birthing parent-baby units) or fear of stigma, fear of child protective services involvement, and limited access to appropriate psychiatric services, as well as the likelihood of misdiagnosis with other postpartum disorders. The first month following childbirth is associated with a higher relative risk for hospital admission due to psychosis when compared to other times in an individual's life. While no specific genetic factors have been linked to PPP, a family history or personal history of bipolar disorder has been strongly associated with higher risk for PPP episodes (see Risk Factors).

== Postpartum bipolar disorder ==
Following childbirth, the rate of new diagnoses of bipolar disorder is 2.6%. With a prior diagnosis of bipolar disorder, 54.9% of patients experienced a mood episode (depression, hypomania, mania, or mixed episode).

=== Signs and symptoms ===
Delusions have been associated with this disorder (including delusional parasitosis, delusional misidentification syndrome, and denial of pregnancy or birth), as well as hallucinations, disorders of the will and self, catalepsy and other symptoms of catatonia, self-mutilation and other severe disturbances of mood. Historically, literature from the 18th century also describes symptoms not typically documented today, such as rhyming speech, enhanced intellect, and enhanced perception.

These psychoses are placed in the World Health Organization's ICD-10 under the rubric of acute and transient psychotic disorders. Together, the manic and cycloid variants make up about two thirds of childbearing psychoses.

=== Diagnosis ===
Postpartum bipolar disorders must be distinguished from a long list of organic psychoses that can present in the puerperium, and from other non-organic psychoses; both of these groups are described below. It is also necessary to distinguish them from other psychiatric disorders associated with childbirth, such as anxiety disorders, depression, post-traumatic stress disorder, complaining disorders and bonding disorders (emotional rejection of the infant), which occasionally cause diagnostic difficulties.

Clinical assessment requires obtaining the history from the postpartum individual themself and, because she is often severely ill, lacking in insight and unable to give a clear account of events, from at least one close relative. A social work report and, in sufferers of postpartum psychosis admitted to hospital, nursing observations are information sources of great value. A physical examination and laboratory investigations may disclose somatic illness complicating the obstetric events, which sometimes provokes psychosis. It is important to obtain the case records of previous episodes of mental illness, and, in patients with multiple episodes, to construct a summary of the whole course of her psychiatric history in relation to her life.

In the 10th edition of the International Classification of Diseases, published in 1992, the recommendation is to classify these cases by the form of the illness, without highlighting the postpartum state. There is, however, a category F53.1, entitled 'severe mental and behavioural disorders associated with the puerperium', which can be used when it is not possible to diagnose some variety of affective disorder or schizophrenia. The DSM-5, published in May 2013, allows the use of a 'peripartum onset specifier' in episodes of mania, hypomania or major depression if the symptoms occur during pregnancy or the first four weeks of the puerperium. The failure to recognize postpartum psychosis, and its complexity, is unhelpful to clinicians, epidemiologists, and other researchers.

=== Onset groups ===
Postpartum bipolar disease belongs to the bipolar spectrum, whose disorders exist in two contrasting forms – mania and depression. They are highly heritable, and affected individuals (less than 1% of the population) have a lifelong tendency (diathesis) to develop psychotic episodes in certain circumstances. The 'triggers' include a number of pharmaceutical agents, surgical operations, adrenal corticosteroids, seasonal changes, menstruation and childbearing. Research into puerperal mania is, therefore, not the study of a 'disease-in-its-own right', but an investigation into the childbearing triggers of bipolar disorder.

Psychoses triggered in the first two weeks after the birth – between the first postpartum day (or even during parturition until about the 15th day – complicate approximately 1/1,000 pregnancies. The impression is sometimes given that this is the only trigger associated with childbearing. But there is evidence of four other triggers – late postpartum, prepartum, post-abortion and weaning. Marcé, widely considered an authority on puerperal psychoses, claimed that they could be divided into early and late forms; the late form begins about six weeks after childbirth, associated with the return of the menses. His view is supported by the large number of cases in the literature with onset 4–13 weeks after the birth, mothers with serial 4-13 week onsets and some survey evidence. The evidence for a trigger acting in pregnancy is also based on the large number of reported cases, and particularly on the frequency of postpartum individuals experiencing two or more prepartum episodes. There is evidence, especially from surveys, of bipolar episodes triggered by abortion (miscarriage or termination). The evidence for a weaning trigger rests on 32 cases in the literature, of which 14 were recurrent. The relative frequency of these five triggers is given by the number of cases in the literature – just over half early postpartum onset, 20% each late postpartum and prepartum onset, and the rest post-abortion and weaning onset.

In addition, episodes starting after childbirth may be triggered by adrenal corticosteroids, surgical operations (such as Caesarean section) or bromocriptine as an alternative to, or in addition to, the postpartum trigger.

=== Course ===
With modern treatment, a full recovery can be expected within 6–10 weeks. After recovery from the psychosis, some postpartum parents have depression, which can last for weeks or months. About one third have a relapse, with a return of psychotic symptoms a few weeks after recovery; these relapses are not due to a failure to comply with medication, because they were often described before pharmaceutical treatment was discovered. A minority have a series of periodic relapses related to the menstrual cycle. Complete recovery and resuming of normal life and a normal birthing parent-infant relationship is the rule.

Many of these new parents experience other bipolar episodes, on the average about one every six years. Although suicide is almost unknown in an acute puerperal manic or cycloid episode, depressive episodes later in life carry an increased risk.

In the event of a further pregnancy, the recurrence rate is high – in the largest series, about three quarters had a recurrence, but not always in the early puerperium; the recurrence could occur during pregnancy, or later in the postpartum period.

=== Management, treatment and prevention ===
==== Pre-conception counseling ====
Individuals with a personal or family history of puerperal psychosis or bipolar disorder are at higher risk of a puerperal episode. The highest risk of all (82%) is a combination of a previous postpartum episode and at least one earlier non-puerperal episode. Counseling regarding risks of recurrence should be discussed with patients who have these risk factors, and may include the potential side effects to the fetus associated with certain psychiatric medications, the frequency of episode recurrence, and the risks and benefits of various treatments during pregnancy and breast-feeding. The teratogenic risks of antipsychotic agents are small, but are higher with lithium and anti-convulsant agents. Carbamazepine, an anticonvulsant, when taken in early pregnancy, has some teratogenic effects, but valproate, a different member of the anticonvulsant class, is associated with spina bifida and other major malformations, and a foetal valproate syndrome; it is not usually recommended in people who may become pregnant. More recent reviews demonstrate varying effects of different anticonvulsants (or antiepileptic medications) when given during pregnancy: the type of medication, dosage, and timing of the medication during pregnancy has different levels of safety for the fetus. Given late in pregnancy, antipsychotic agents and lithium can have adverse effects on the infant. Stopping mood-stabilisers carries a higher risk for bipolar episode recurrence during pregnancy.

==== Home treatment and hospitalization ====
It has been recognized since the 19th century that it is optimal for a woman with puerperal psychosis to be treated at home, where she can maintain her role as homemaker and mother to her other children, and develop her relationship with the new-born. But there are many risks, and it is essential that she is monitored by a competent adult round the clock, and visited frequently by professional staff. Home treatment is a counsel of perfection and most sufferers will be admitted to a psychiatric hospital, many as an emergency, and usually without their babies. In a few countries, especially Australia, Belgium, France, India, the Netherlands, Switzerland and the United Kingdom, special units allow the admission of both woman and infant. Conjoint admission has many advantages, but the risks to the infant of admission to a ward full of severely ill parents should not be understated, and the high ratio of nursing staff, required to safeguard the infants, make these among the most expensive psychiatric units.

==== Treatment of the acute episode ====
Individuals with this illness require sedation with anti-psychotic (neuroleptic) agents, but are liable to extrapyramidal symptoms, including neuroleptic malignant syndrome. Since the link with bipolar disorder was recognized (about 1970), treatment with mood-stabilizing agents, such as lithium and anti-convulsant drugs, has been employed with success. Electroconvulsive therapy has the reputation of efficacy in this disorder, and it can be given during pregnancy (avoiding the risk of pharmaceutical treatment), with due precautions. But there have been no trials, and Dutch experience has shown that almost all birthing parents recover quickly without it. After recovery the person suffering from postpartum psychosis may need antidepressant treatment and/or prophylactic mood stabilizers; she will need counselling about the risk of recurrence and will often appreciate psychotherapeutic support.

==== Prevention ====
There is much evidence that lithium can at least partly prevent episodes in those at high risk. It is dangerous during parturition, when pressure in the pelvis can obstruct the ureters and raise blood levels. Started after the birth its adverse effects are minimal, even in breast-fed infants.

=== Causes ===
The cause of postpartum bipolar disorder breaks down into two parts – the nature of the brain anomalies that predispose to manic and depressive symptoms, and the triggers that provoke these symptoms in those with the bipolar diathesis. The genetic, anatomical and neurochemical basis of bipolar disorder is at present unknown, and is one of the most important projects in psychiatry; but is not the main concern here. The challenge and opportunity presented by the childbearing psychoses is to identify the triggers of early postpartum onset and other onset groups.

Considering that these psychoses have been known for centuries, little effort has so far been made to understand the underlying biology. Research has lagged far behind other areas of medicine and psychiatry. There is a dearth of knowledge and of theories. There is evidence of heritability, both from family studies and molecular genetics. Early onset cases occur more frequently in first time parents, but this is not true of late postpartum or pregnancy onset. There are not many other predictors. Sleep deprivation has been suggested. Inhibition of steroid sulphatase caused behavioural abnormalities in mice. A recent hypothesis, supported by collateral studies, invokes the re-awakening of auto-immunity after its suppression during pregnancy, on the model of multiple sclerosis or autoimmune thyroiditis; a related hypothesis has proposed that abnormal immune system processes (regulatory T cell biology) and consequent changes in myelinogenesis may increase postpartum psychosis risk. Aberrant steroid hormone–dependent regulation of neuronal calcium influx via extracellular matrix proteins and membrane receptors involved in responding to the cell's microenvironment might be important in conferring biological risk. Another promising lead is based on the similarity of bipolar-cycloid puerperal and menstrual psychosis; many people have had both. Late-onset puerperal psychoses, and relapses may be linked to menstruation. Since almost all reproductive onsets occur when the menstrual cycle is released from a long period of inhibition, this may be a common factor, but it can hardly explain episodes starting in the 2nd and 3rd trimesters of pregnancy.

=== Research directions ===
The lack of a formal diagnosis in the DSM and ICD has hindered research. Research is needed to improve the care and treatment of affected individuals, but it is of paramount importance to investigate the causes, because this can lead to long term control and elimination of the disease. The opportunities come under the heading of clinical observation, the study of the acute episode, long-term studies, epidemiology, genetics and neuroscience.

== Other non-organic postpartum psychoses ==
=== Psychogenic psychosis ===
This is the name given to a psychosis whose theme, onset and course are all related to an extremely stressful event. The psychotic symptom is usually a delusion. Over 50 cases have been described, but usually in unusual circumstances, such as abortion or adoption, or in fathers at the time of the birth of one of their children. They are occasionally seen after normal childbirth.

=== Early postpartum stupor ===
Brief states of stupor have rarely been described in the first few hours or days after the birth. They are similar to parturient delirium and stupor, which are among the psychiatric disorders of childbirth.

== Organic postpartum psychoses ==
There are at least a dozen organic (neuropsychiatric) psychoses that can present in pregnancy or soon after childbirth. The clinical picture is usually delirium – a global disturbance of cognition, affecting consciousness, attention, comprehension, perception and memory – but amnesic syndromes and a mania-like state also occur. The two most recent were described in 1980 and 2010, and it is quite likely that others will be described. Organic psychoses, especially those due to infection, may be more common in nations with high parturient morbidity.

=== Infective delirium ===
The most common organic postpartum psychosis is infective delirium. This was mentioned by Hippocrates: there are 8 cases of puerperal or post-abortion sepsis among the 17 women in the 1st and 3rd books of epidemics, all complicated by delirium. In Europe and North America the foundation of the metropolitan maternity hospitals, together with instrumental deliveries and the practice of attending necropsies, led to epidemics of streptococcal puerperal fever, resulting in maternal mortality rates up to 10%. The peak was about 1870, after which antisepsis and asepsis gradually brought them under control. These severe infections were often complicated by delirium, but it was not until the nosological advances of Chaslin and Bonhöffer that they could be distinguished from other causes of postpartum psychosis. Infective delirium hardly ever starts during pregnancy, and usually begins in the first postpartum week. The onset of sepsis and delirium are closely related, and the course parallels the infection, although about 20% of patients continue to have chronic confusional states after recovery from the infection. Recurrences after another pregnancy are rare. Their frequency began to decline at the end of the 19th century, and fell steeply after the discovery of the sulphonamides. Puerperal sepsis is still common in Bangladesh, Nigeria and Zambia. Even in the United Kingdom, cases are still occasionally seen. It would be a mistake to forget this cause of puerperal psychosis.

=== Eclamptic and Donkin psychoses ===
Eclampsia is the sudden eruption of convulsions in a pregnant woman, usually around the time of delivery. It is the late complication of pre-eclamptic toxaemia (gestosis). Although its frequency in nations with excellent obstetric services has fallen below 1/500 pregnancies, it is still common in many other countries. The primary pathology is in the placenta, which secretes an anti-angiogenic factor in response to ischaemia, leading to endothelial dysfunction. In fatal cases, there are arterial lesions in many organs including the brain. This is the second most frequent organic psychosis, and the second to be described. Psychoses occur in about 5% of cases, and about 240 detailed cases have been reported. It particularly affects individuals whom are giving birth first time. Seizures may begin before, during or after labour, but the onset of psychosis is almost always postpartum. These individuals usually experience delirium but some have manic features. The duration is remarkably short, with a median duration of 8 days. This, together with the absence of a family history and of recurrences, contrasts with puerperal bipolar/cycloid psychoses. After recovery, amnesia and sometimes retrograde memory loss may occur, as well as other permanent cerebral lesions such as dysphasia, hemiplegia or blindness.

A variant was described by Donkin. He had been trained by Simpson (one of those who first recognized the importance of albuminuria) in Edinburgh, and recognized that some cases of eclamptic psychosis occurred without seizures; this explains the interval between seizures (or coma) and psychosis, a gap that has occasionally exceeded 4 days: seizures and psychosis are two different consequences of severe gestosis. Donkin psychosis may not be rare: a British series included 13 possible cases; but clarifying its distinction from postpartum bipolar disorder requires prospective investigations in collaboration with obstetricians.

=== Wernicke–Korsakoff syndrome ===
Wernicke–Korsakoff syndrome was described by Wernicke and Korsakoff. The pathology is damage to the core of the brain including the thalamus and mamillary bodies. Its most striking clinical feature is loss of memory, which can be permanent. It is usually found in severe alcoholics, but can also result from pernicious vomiting of pregnancy (hyperemesis gravidarum), because the requirement for thiamine is much increased in pregnancy; nearly 200 cases have been reported. The cause is vitamin B_{1} (thiamine) deficiency. This has been available for treatment and prevention since 1936, so the occurrence of this syndrome in pregnancy should be extinct. But these cases continue to be reported – more than 50 in this century – from all over the world, including some from countries with advanced medical services; most are due to rehydration without vitamin supplements. A pregnant woman who presents in a dehydrated state due to pernicious vomiting urgently needs thiamine, as well as intravenous fluids.

=== Vascular disorders ===
Various vascular disorders occasionally cause psychosis, especially cerebral venous thrombosis. Puerperal individuals are liable to thrombosis, especially thrombophlebitis of the leg and pelvic veins; aseptic thrombi can also form in the dural venous sinuses and the cerebral veins draining into them. Most patients present with headache, vomiting, seizures and focal signs such as hemiplegia or dysphasia, but a minority of cases have a psychiatric presentation. The incidence is about 1 in 1,000 births in Europe and North America, but much higher in India, where large series have been collected. Psychosis is occasionally associated with other arterial or venous lesions: epidural anaesthesia can, if the dura is punctured, lead to leakage of cerebrospinal fluid and subdural haematoma. Arterial occlusion may be due to thrombi, amniotic fragments or air embolism. Postpartum cerebral angiopathy is a transitory arterial spasm of medium caliber cerebral arteries; it was first described in cocaine and amphetamine addicts, but can also complicate ergot and bromocriptine prescribed to inhibit lactation. Subarachnoid haemorrhage can occur after miscarriage or childbirth. All these usually present with neurological symptoms, and occasionally with delirium.

=== Epilepsy ===
Those with a lifelong epileptic history are liable to psychoses during pregnancy, labour and the puerperium. Some pregnant people occasionally develop epilepsy for the first time in relation to their first pregnancy, and psychotic episodes have been described. There are over 30 cases in the literature.

=== Hypopituitarism ===
Pituitary necrosis following postpartum haemorrhage (Sheehan's syndrome) leads to failure and atrophy of the gonads, adrenal and thyroid. Chronic psychoses can supervene many years later, based on myxoedema, hypoglycaemia or Addisonian crisis. But these patients can also develop acute and recurrent psychoses, even as early as the puerperium.

=== Water intoxication ===
Hyponatraemia (which leads to delirium) can complicate oxytocin treatment, usually when given to induce an abortion. By 1975, 29 cases had been reported, of which three were severe or fatal.

=== Urea cycle disorders ===
Inborn errors of the Krebs-Henseleit urea cycle lead to hyperammonaemia. In carriers and heterozygotes, encephalopathy can develop in pregnancy or the puerperium. Cases have been described in carbamoyl phosphate synthetase 1, argino-succinate synthetase and ornithine carbamoyltransferase deficiency.

=== Anti-NMDA receptor encephalitis ===
The most recent form of organic childbearing psychosis to be described is encephalitis associated with antibodies to the NMDA receptor; these individuals often have ovarian teratomas. A Japanese review found ten reported during pregnancy and five after delivery.

=== Other organic psychoses with a specific link to childbearing ===
Sydenham's chorea, of which chorea gravidarum is a severe variant, has a number of psychiatric complications, which include psychosis. This usually develops during pregnancy, and occasionally after the birth or abortion. Its symptoms include severe hypnagogic hallucinations (hypnagogia), possibly the result of the extreme sleep disorder. This form of chorea was caused by streptococcal infections, which at present respond to antibiotics; it still occurs as a result of systemic lupus or anti-phospholipid syndromes. Only about 50 chorea psychoses have been reported, and only one this century; but it could return if the streptococcus escapes control. Alcohol withdrawal states (delirium tremens) occur in addicts whose intake has been interrupted by trauma or surgery; this can happen after childbirth. Postpartum confusional states have also been reported during withdrawal from opium and barbiturates. One would expect acquired immunodeficiency syndrome (HIV/AIDS) encephalitis to present in pregnancy or the puerperium, because it is a venereal disease that can progress rapidly; one case of AIDS encephalitis, presenting in the 28th week of gestation, has been reported from Haiti, and there may be others in countries where AIDS is rife. Anaemia is common in pregnancy and the puerperium, and folate deficiency has been linked to psychosis.

=== Incidental organic psychoses ===
The psychoses, mentioned above, all had a recognized connection with childbearing. But medical disorders with no specific link have presented with psychotic symptoms in the puerperium; in them the association seems to be fortuitous. They include neurosyphilis, encephalitis including von Economo's, meningitis, cerebral tumours, thyroid disease and ischaemic heart disease.

== Society and culture ==
=== Support ===
In the UK, a series of workshops called "Unravelling Eve" were held in 2011 in which women who had experienced postpartum depression shared their stories.

=== Cases ===
==== Harriet Sarah ====
Harriet Sarah, Lady Mordaunt (1848–1906), formerly Harriet Moncreiffe, was the Scottish wife of an English baronet and Member of Parliament, Sir Charles Mordaunt. She was the defendant in a sensational divorce case in which the Prince of Wales (later King Edward VII) was embroiled; after a controversial trial lasting seven days, the jury determined that Lady Mordaunt had "puerperal mania" and her husband's petition for divorce was dismissed, while Lady Mordaunt was committed to an asylum.

==== Andrea Yates ====
Andrea Yates had depression and in 2001, four months after the birth of her fifth child, relapsed, with psychotic features. Several weeks later, she drowned all five children. Under the law in Texas, she was sentenced to life imprisonment, but, after a retrial, was committed to a mental hospital.

==== Lindsay Clancy ====
Lindsay Clancy, a labor and delivery nurse from Duxbury, Massachusetts, fatally strangled her three children on the evening of January 24, 2023. After she strangled the children, she attempted to kill herself by jumping from a window, causing her to become paralyzed from the waist down. Experts for the defense argued that Clancy suffered from postpartum psychosis and should not be held criminally responsible. Though the prosecution while acknowledging she struggled with mental illness, prosecutors alleged that Lindsay's actions before the killings showed planning and rational thought.

The incident ignited a discussion on social media platforms such as TikTok about postpartum psychosis. Several bills were introduced to the Massachusetts state legislature in an attempt to better address postpartum illnesses in the state.

=== In fiction ===
Guy de Maupassant, in his novel Mont-Oriol (1887), described a brief postpartum psychotic episode.

Charlotte Perkins Gilman, in her short story "The Yellow Wallpaper" (1892), described severe depression with psychotic features starting after childbirth, perhaps similar to that experienced by the author herself.

Stacey Slater, a fictional character in the long-running BBC soap-opera EastEnders had postpartum psychosis in 2016, and was one of the show's biggest storylines that year.

In the season 2 House, M.D. episode "Forever", House takes the case of a mother with postpartum psychosis.

=== Legal status ===
Postpartum psychosis, especially when there is a marked component of depression, has a small risk of filicide. In acute manic or cycloid cases, this risk is about 1%. Most of these incidents have occurred before the mother came under treatment, and some have been accidental. Several nations, including Canada, the United Kingdom, Australia, and Italy, recognize postpartum mental illness as a mitigating factor in cases where mothers kill their children. The use of postpartum psychosis as a large legal defense in infanticide has been inconsistent across jurisdictions as there tend to be varying standards for how court interpret the relationship between mental illness and criminal responsibility. In the United States, such a legal distinction was not made as of 2009, and an insanity defense is not available in all states. Overall, the legalities of PPP raise concerns about how severe psychiatric illness is addressed within criminal justice systems. In some cases, those experiencing PPP are more likely to be criminalized for behaviors demonstrated during a psychiatric emergency instead of being treated as one in need of urgent mental health crisis intervention.

The United Kingdom has had the Infanticide Act since 1922.
