= Specifier =

Specifier may refer to:

- Specifier (linguistics), the sister node of an X' category
- Specifier (psychology), a diagnostic to specify a mental disorder or illness
