= Menstruation and mental health =

Menstruation and mental health are closely connected, as hormonal fluctuations throughout the menstrual cycle influence mood, cognition, and emotional well-being. Many individuals experience mood swings, irritability, anxiety, and depression in the days leading up to menstruation, a cluster of symptoms commonly referred to as premenstrual syndrome (PMS). In more severe cases, individuals may develop premenstrual dysphoric disorder (PMDD), a condition characterized by intense mood disturbances, cognitive impairments, and somatic symptoms that follow a cyclical pattern. Additionally, menstruation can exacerbate preexisting mental health conditions. The interplay between hormonal changes, neurochemical activity, and psychological health has been a growing focus of scientific research and public discourse.

== Premenstrual disturbances ==
The period before menstruation, known as the luteal phase, is often linked to emotional distress. Conditions related to the menstrual cycle encompass premenstrual tension syndrome, premenstrual dysphoric disorder, and the exacerbation of another medical condition during the premenstrual phase.

Menstruation is linked to a range of psychopathological symptoms, such as lower self-esteem, increased anxiety, dysphoria, and feelings of being persecuted. Changes in behavior, like decreased social interaction during menstruation, can lead to feelings of loneliness and potentially contribute to the development of depression. Several reviews have reported that psychopathological symptoms and mental disorders, such as psychoses, suicidal tendencies, post-traumatic stress disorder, and addictive behaviors, tend to worsen during menstruation. Variations in ovarian hormone levels are also linked to the presence of symptoms related to eating disorders. Some comprehensive studies have indicated that women might be at a higher risk of suicide during menstruation. The symptoms occurring during menstruation can have a significant impact on mental health and lead to severe consequences.

=== Premenstrual tension syndrome ===
Premenstrual tension syndrome is a condition marked by particular metabolic, environmental, or behavioral factors that arise during the luteal phase of the menstrual cycle. It results in recurring somatic, behavioral, or affective symptoms that disrupt a person's daily life. While the quality of studies and their findings in this area can vary, it's common for women to report symptoms like mood swings, depression, tension, irritability, and anger occurring before their period.

=== Premenstrual dysphoric disorder ===
Premenstrual dysphoric disorder is an affective disorder characterized by emotional, cognitive, and somatic symptoms that consistently occur in the days leading up to menstruation and improve shortly after it begins. These somatic symptoms encompass joint pain, overeating, and lethargy, while cognitive symptoms involve forgetfulness and difficulty concentrating. Mood-related symptoms consist of irritability and depression. Studies evaluating the use of combined oral contraceptive pills containing both progesterone and estrogen have demonstrated their effectiveness in alleviating the symptoms of premenstrual dysphoric disorder.

=== Comorbidity ===
Premenstrual disorders are usually comorbid with many psychiatric conditions, suich as anxiety and personality disorders. Psychotic symptoms tend to worsen when estrogen levels drop during the premenstrual period, leading to increased psychiatric admissions for women with schizophrenia just before and during their menstrual cycles. Estrogen may have a neuroprotective role by influencing neurotransmitters such as serotonin, dopamine, and norepinephrine. These are all associated with mood regulation, which is how psychotic symptoms could worsen. Another contributing factor to the higher incidence of schizophrenia onset in midlife women may be the reduced estrogen levels associated with menopause. In women with bipolar disorder, especially bipolar II disorder, premenstrual syndrome and premenstrual dysphoric disorder are common. For those women who experience these premenstrual conditions, bipolar affective symptoms and mood swings may be more severe.

== Menstrual psychosis ==
Menstrual psychosis was documented in the mid-19th century and has been extensively discussed in numerous articles. However, it is not widely recognized or diagnosed by modern psychiatrists. The earliest clear clinical descriptions of this condition emerged in French literature around 1850, with most well-documented cases appearing in German literature between 1880 and 1930. As per British psychiatrist Ian Brockington, diagnosing menstrual psychosis requires specific criteria to be met, including symptoms recurring in sync with the menstrual cycle, acute onset against a background of normality, a brief duration followed by complete recovery, and the presence of psychotic features such as delusions, hallucinations, confusion, mutism, stupor, or manic syndrome. Menstrual psychosis is not formally classified, however, new studies and clinical reports continue to explore how hormonal fluctuations in estrogen and progesterone could trigger symptoms. Management for menstrual psychosis typically focuses on hormonal therapy, antipsychotic medications, and mood stabilizers, although standardized treatment guidelines have not been established.

== Daily life impact ==
Menstruation affects many individuals' daily lives beyond certain mental disorders. A survey conducted with over 42,000 women found that common menstruation symptoms, such as stress and fatigue, caused women to be impacted significantly in their daily lives. These symptoms meant that individuals had to prepare for their lives in advance because of the possible challenges that could be experienced by them. In high-pressure environments such as the workplace or school, menstruation can cause extra stress and affect productivity and engagement. Menstruation can present daily challenges that affect how someone may do their usual routine.

Furthermore, menstruation causes additional stress because of the access that someone may have to menstrual products and healthcare. Socioeconomic factors have a major role in the access to these products and whether someone has the proper means to deal with their menstruation-related symptoms and menstrual disorders. People may experience heavier menstrual flow or migraines and may lack the access to treatment if they are from a lower socioeconomic status, which is shown in period poverty. These disparities show how menstruation-related mental health challenges can be affected by social and economic status.

== See also ==
- Miscarriage and mental disorders
- Psychiatric disorders of childbirth
