= Psychiatric disorders of childbirth =

Psychiatric disorders of childbirth (parturition, labor, delivery), as opposed to those of pregnancy or the postpartum period, are psychiatric complications that develop during or immediately following childbirth. Despite modern obstetrics and pain control, these disorders are still observed. Most often, psychiatric disorders of childbirth present as delirium, stupor, rage, acts of desperation, or neonaticide. These psychiatric complications are rarely seen in patients under modern medical supervision. However, care disparities between Europe, North America, Australia, Japan, and other countries with advanced medical care and the rest of the world persist. The wealthiest nations represent 10 million births each year out of the world's total of 135 million. These nations have a maternal mortality rate (MMR) of 6–20/100,000. Poorer nations with high birth rates can have an MMR more than 100 times higher. In Africa, India & South East Asia, as well as Latin America, these complications of parturition may still be as prevalent as they have been throughout human history.

== Three settings for childbirth ==
=== Modern childbirth ===
In nations with state-of-the-art obstetric services, childbirth is usually supervised by a midwife or obstetrician. Pain can be relieved by nitrous oxide, pethidine or an epidural anesthetic. Complications can be dealt with promptly, if necessary, by emergency Caesarean, also known as a C-section. These services are now standard procedure in many countries. Even so, parturition can still be a severe ordeal, and at least one third find it to be a traumatic experience. Labor may last anywhere from a few hours to a few days, thus leading to an emotionally and physically intense experience, as shown by the frequency of post-traumatic stress disorder. The complications listed below, though rare, can still occur.

=== Historic childbirth ===
"Historic childbirth" is a term used to describe the birth of children before the introduction of effective pain relief in 1847. During that time psychiatric complications were clearly described, well recognized and common in countries with the best health services. Those conditions still exist in nations with high birth rates and a dearth of trained staff. At the beginning of this century only about one third of births in tropical Africa and South-East Asia were attended by doctors or midwives. Although there has been some improvement since then, it is still true that about half the births in many nations are not supervised by skilled attendants. Traditional birth attendants are widespread.

=== Clandestine labor ===
The third setting is concealed labor, endured by a woman who has dissembled her pregnancy. Not only is there no analgesia or skilled attendance, but there is no emotional support; on the contrary, the mother's mental state is disturbed by anger, fear, shame or despair. Most neonaticides occur in this setting. Perpetrators have rarely given a personal account, but experienced obstetricians have attempted a graphic description of their state of mind. There is objective evidence that complications are much more common.

== Tokophobia ==
The word comes from the Greek τόκος (tókos), meaning parturition. Early authors like Ideler wrote about this fear, and, in 1937, Binder drew attention to a group of women who sought sterilization because of tokophobia. In the last 40 years there have been a series of papers published mainly from Scandinavia. Tokophobia can be primary (before the first child is born) or secondary (typically after extremely traumatic deliveries). Elective Caesarean section is one solution, but psychotherapy can also help these women to give birth vaginally.

== Obstetric factitious disorder ==
Factitious disorder (self-induced illness) can take many forms, and, during pregnancy, they include obstetric complications such as antepartum bleeding and hyperemesis. Presentation of factitious disorders during pregnancy can also take the form of simulation of labor by contractions of the abdominal muscles or manipulation of tocodynamometry. Case studies of pregnant women with factitious disorders have documented the repeated self-induction of premature labor by rupture of the membranes, by prostaglandin suppositories, or both.

== Delirium during labor ==
Under the name 'parturient delirium', this is defined as an acute clouding of consciousness, lasting minutes or hours, with full recovery. Onset is usually towards the end of labor, and recovery after the birth. Any of the following may be observed – incoherent speech, misidentification of persons, visual hallucinations, inappropriate behavior such as singing, or memory loss for the episode. A phasic course, with alternate delirium and clarity, continuation into the puerperium, and recurrence after another pregnancy have been described in a few cases.

It was one of the first psychiatric disorders, related to childbearing, to be described, and its importance in the early 19th century is indicated by an early classification, stating that it was one of two recognized forms of puerperal insanity. More than 50 cases have been described, most of them in the epoch when parturition was endured without effective pain relief. The disorder has almost disappeared in nations with advanced obstetrics, with only two early 20th century reports. But, within the last ten years, there were 28 nations in which fewer than half the births were attended by skilled birth attendants; they included Nigeria, Pakistan, Ethiopia and Bangladesh, each with more than 3 million births/year. In 2012, it was estimated that 130-180 million infants would be delivered in the quinquennium 2011-2015 without skilled birth attendance. There are still many countries where parturition in the 21st century is like that in Europe in the early 19th century, and women are at risk of becoming delirious during labor.

== Unconscious delivery ==
Childbirth can occur during natural sleep, and under excessively heavy sedation, including alcohol intoxication. A diverse list of medical disorders have led to delivery during coma, including head injury, antepartum bleeding, severe hypotension and hypothermia. Of these the commonest is eclampsia. There are ten cases in the literature of unexplained stupor or coma, including cases with features of catatonia.

== Acts of desperation ==
In women facing death during obstructed labor, panic or despair can drive them to take desperate remedies. There are about twenty cases of suicide or suicide attempts. The suicidal motive is not depression or shame, but unbearable pain and despair. The methods – throwing themselves out of the window, hanging or drowning – show the extremity of the woman's suffering.

There are more than 20 descriptions of auto-Caesarean section. In a few cases the apparent motive has been psychiatric illness, but the majority were either the destruction of an unwanted child, or desperate remedies when the infant cannot be delivered and the nearest obstetric unit was beyond reach. Most of these cases have been reported from poor countries, where contributions to literature are scarce, and they may be more common there. The mother usually survives, but few infants survive.

== Psychosis during labor ==
Various psychoses can start during labor. Of the organic psychoses, eclamptic, Donkin, epileptic and infective psychoses have all started during labor, although postpartum onset is usual. These differ from parturient delirium in their duration, lasting at least a few days, rather than a few hours. In addition, there are 19 cases of bipolar episodes with onset during labor; they differ from parturient delirium in their symptomatology (mania rather than delirium) and duration measured in weeks. These cases are evidence that, on the balance of probability, the trigger of bipolar/cycloid episodes is already active during parturition.

== Parturient rage ==
During the final painful contractions which lead to the expulsion of the infant, some women have become extremely angry. Before the introduction of effective pain relief (1847), obstetricians were familiar with this, and referred to it under names like parturient rage, furor uterinus, Wut der Gebärenden and colère d'accouchées. Some mothers lost control and attacked their husbands, obstetricians, midwives or other attendants. At one time it was common, and clearly described. It still occurs occasionally under modern obstetric conditions. The infant is at risk, because angry mothers have reached down to haul the baby out, or made a dangerous assault on the new-born; for example, a 40-year-old mother, at the end of her 1st pregnancy, kicked away the midwife, tore out the infant, and killed it by striking its head against the bedpost. In most neonaticides, the infant is killed by suffocation, drowning or exposure. In some cases, significant brutality has been documented – the head smashed with multiple fractures or splintering of bone, the head cut or torn off, the infant stabbed many times, or a combination of these. The pathology bears witness to the mother's mental state. Nowadays, this phenomenon would not be regarded as a mental illness, and the only diagnosis could be 'unspecified disorder of adult personality and behavior. But this has not always been so. In France, Esquirol mentioned a mother who stabbed her infant 26 times with a pair of scissors; she was acquitted because the judges considered that she was suffering from mental derangement. There is an insoluble judicial problem, because violence is sometimes a feature of delirium; in a clandestine birth, it is impossible to know whether consciousness was clouded or not.

== Pathological mental states immediately after the birth ==
Immediately after giving birth, an exhausted mother, fainting or in shock, may not be able to care for the newborn, who often needs resuscitation, and can suffocate in mucus or blood. Exhaustion alone, without syncope or delirium, can prevent a mother from helping a dying infant. In clandestine labors, this can be fatal to the newborn, without mens rea.

Brief states of delirium have been described with onset after the birth, less common but similar to those that occur during parturition. There are about 20 in the literature. Several of them have been accompanied by violence, and, after recovery a few hours later, followed by amnesia. Occasionally mothers have had recurrent episodes.

Postpartum stupor has been described, beginning immediately or very shortly after the birth. The mother remains speechless, immobile, and unresponsive to any stimuli for hours or even a day or more. These stupors differ in duration and clinical features from postpartum bipolar disorder. They have been phasic, with recovery and relapse. Their causes are unknown.

== Childbirth-related post-traumatic stress disorder (PTSD) ==
Postpartum PTSD was first described in 1978. Since then more than 100 papers have been published. After excessively painful labors, or those with a disturbing loss of control, fear of death or infant loss, or complications requiring forceps delivery or emergency Caesarean section, some mothers experience symptoms similar to those occurring after other harrowing experiences; these include intrusive memories (flashbacks), nightmares, and a high-tension state, with avoidance of triggers such as hospitals or words associated with parturition. The frequency depends on criteria and severity, but figures of 2-4% are representative; these symptoms can last for many months. Some avoid further pregnancy (secondary tocophobia), and those who become pregnant again may experience a return of symptoms, especially in the last trimester. These mothers can be helped by counseling soon after birth or a variety of trauma-focused psychological therapies.

== Complaining reactions ==
Another reaction to a severe experience of childbirth is pathological complaining (paranoia querulans in the International Classification of Diseases). These mothers complain bitterly about perceived mismanagement. The complaints, directed at midwives or other staff members, vary from lack of pain relief, unnecessary epidural anesthesia, poor condition of the baby, humiliation or 'dehumanization', excessive use of technology, student examinations, or lack of explanation and sympathy. One mother's intense resentment was her husband suggesting the wrong name for the infant. In response to these 'outrages', mothers may harangue the midwives repeatedly or write critical letters and are preoccupied with fantasies of revenge – 'beating the midwives to pulp', 'smashing the doctor's head in', 'burning the hospital down'. Angry rumination may continue for weeks, months or more than a year. The frequency is similar to post-traumatic stress disorder, and there is an association between the two complications. The effect on childcare is like that of severe depression, but the emotional state (furious anger, not sadness and despair) and treatment strategy are different. Psychotherapy is directed at distracting the mother from her grievances and reinforcing productive child-centered activity; a diary is a useful focus – the therapist listens with sympathy to her complaints, then turns to the written record, expressing pleasure and interest in the mother's achievements in spite of them.

== See also ==
- Menstruation and mental health
- Gender disappointment
- Postpartum depression
- Postpartum psychosis

== Bibliography ==
- Brockington, Ian F. (2017). The Psychoses of Menstruation and Childbearing. Cambridge: Cambridge University Press. doi:10.1017/9781316286517. ISBN 978-1-316-28651-7.
- Brockington, Ian F. (2007). Eileithyia's mischief: the organic psychoses of pregnancy, parturition and the peurperium. I. Brockington. ISBN 978-0-9540633-2-0.
