= Diagnostic and Statistical Manual of Mental Disorders =

American psychiatric classification

1952 edition of the DSM (DSM-I)

The Diagnostic and Statistical Manual of Mental Disorders (DSM; latest edition: DSM-5-TR, published in March 2022) is a publication by the American Psychiatric Association (APA) for the classification of mental disorders using a common language and standard criteria. It is an internationally accepted manual on the diagnosis and treatment of mental disorders, though it may be used in conjunction with other (international) classification documents. Other commonly used principal guides of psychiatry include the International Classification of Diseases (ICD), Chinese Classification of Mental Disorders (CCMD), and the Psychodynamic Diagnostic Manual. However, not all providers rely on the DSM-5 as a guide, since the ICD's mental disorder diagnoses are used around the world, and scientific studies often measure changes in symptom scale scores rather than changes in DSM-5 criteria to determine the real-world effects of mental health interventions.

It is used by researchers, psychiatric drug regulation agencies, health insurance companies, pharmaceutical companies, the legal system, and policymakers. Some mental health professionals use the manual to determine and help communicate a patient's diagnosis after an evaluation. Hospitals, clinics, and insurance companies in the United States may require a DSM diagnosis for all patients with mental disorders. Health-care researchers use the DSM to categorize patients for research purposes.

The DSM evolved from systems for collecting census and psychiatric hospital statistics, as well as from a United States Army manual. Revisions since its first publication in 1952 have incrementally added to the total number of mental disorders, while removing those no longer considered to be mental disorders.

Recent editions of the DSM have received praise for standardizing psychiatric diagnosis grounded in empirical evidence, as opposed to the theory-bound nosology (the branch of medical science that deals with the classification of diseases) used in DSM-III. However, it has also generated controversy and criticism, including ongoing questions concerning the reliability and validity of many diagnoses; the use of arbitrary dividing lines between mental illness and "normality"; possible cultural bias; and the medicalization of human distress. The APA itself has published that the inter-rater reliability is low for many disorders in the DSM-5, including major depressive disorder and generalized anxiety disorder.

== Distinction from ICD ==
An alternate, widely used classification publication is the International Classification of Diseases (ICD), produced by the World Health Organization (WHO). The ICD has a broader scope than the DSM, covering overall health as well as mental health; chapter 6 of the ICD specifically covers mental, behavioral and neurodevelopmental disorders. Moreover, while the DSM is the most popular diagnostic system for mental disorders in the US, the ICD is used more widely in Europe and other parts of the world, giving it a far larger reach than the DSM. An international survey of psychiatrists in sixty-six countries compared the use of the ICD-10 and DSM-IV. It found the former was more often used for clinical diagnosis while the latter was more valued for research. This may be because the DSM tends to put more emphasis on clear diagnostic criteria, while the ICD tends to put more emphasis on clinician judgement and avoiding diagnostic criteria unless they are independently validated. That is, the ICD descriptions of psychiatric disorders tend to be more qualitative information, such as general descriptions of what various disorders tend to look like. The DSM focuses more on quantitative and operationalized criteria; e.g., to be diagnosed with X disorder, one must fulfill 5 of 9 criteria for at least 6 months.

Since 1980, every code that has been listed in the DSM has been an ICD-9 code. However, DSM-5, unlike previous versions of DSM, contains both ICD-9 and ICD-10 codes. Though recent editions of the DSM and ICD have become more similar due to collaborative agreements, each one contains information absent from the other. For instance, the two manuals contain overlapping but substantially different lists of recognized culture-bound syndromes. The ICD also tends to focus more on primary-care and low and middle-income countries, as opposed to the DSM's focus on secondary psychiatric care in high-income countries.

== Antecedents (1840–1949) ==
=== Census Office, AMA and ISI (1840–1911) ===
The initial impetus for developing a classification of mental disorders in the United States was the need to collect statistical information. The first official attempt was the 1840 census, which used a single category: "idiocy/insanity". Three years later, the American Statistical Association made an official protest to the U.S. House of Representatives, stating that "the most glaring and remarkable errors are found in the statements respecting nosology, prevalence of insanity, blindness, deafness, and dumbness, among the people of this nation", pointing out that, in many towns, African Americans were all marked as insane, and calling the statistics essentially useless.

The Association of Medical Superintendents of American Institutions for the Insane ("The Superintendents' Association") was formed in 1844.

In 1860, during the international statistical congress held in London, Florence Nightingale made a proposal that was to result in the development of the first international model of systematic collection of hospital data.

In 1872, the American Medical Association (AMA) published its Nomenclature of Diseases, which included various "Disorders of the Intellect". However, its use was short-lived.

Edward Jarvis and later Francis Amasa Walker helped expand the census, from two volumes in 1870 to twenty-five volumes in 1880.

In 1888, the Census Office published Frederick H. Wines' 582-page volume called Report on the Defective, Dependent, and Delinquent Classes of the Population of the United States, As Returned at the Tenth Census (June 1, 1880). Wines used seven categories of mental illness, which were also adopted by the Superintendents: dementia, dipsomania (uncontrollable craving for alcohol), epilepsy, mania, melancholia, monomania, and paresis.

In 1892, the Superintendents' Association expanded its membership to include other mental health workers, and renamed to the American Medico-Psychological Association (AMPA).

In 1893, a French physician, Jacques Bertillon, introduced the Bertillon Classification of Causes of Death at a congress of the International Statistical Institute (ISI) in Chicago. (The ISI had commissioned him to create it in 1891). A number of countries adopted the ISI's system. In 1898, the American Public Health Association (APHA) recommended that United States registrars also adopt the system.

In 1900, an ISI conference in Paris reformed the Bertillion Classification, and created the International List of Causes of Death (ILCD). Another conference would be held every ten years, and a new edition of the ILCD would be released. Five were ultimately issued. Non-fatal conditions were not included.

In 1903, New York's Bellevue Hospital published "The Bellevue Hospital nomenclature of diseases and conditions", which included a section on "Diseases of the Mind". Revisions were released in 1909 and 1911. It was produced with the assistance of the AMA and Bureau of the Census.

=== APA Statistical Manual (1917) and AMA Standard (1933) ===
In 1917, together with the National Commission on Mental Hygiene (now Mental Health America), the American Medico-Psychological Association developed a new guide for mental hospitals called the Statistical Manual for the Use of Institutions for the Insane. This guide included twenty-two diagnoses. It would be revised several times by the Association, and by the tenth edition in 1942, was titled Statistical Manual for the Use of Hospitals of Mental Diseases.

In 1921, the AMPA became the present American Psychiatric Association (APA).

The first edition of the DSM notes in its foreword: "In the late twenties, each large teaching center employed a system of its own origination, no one of which met more than the immediate needs of the local institution."

In 1933, the AMA's general medical guide the Standard Classified Nomenclature of Disease, (referred to as the Standard), was released. Along with the New York Academy of Medicine, the APA provided the psychiatric nomenclature subsection. It became well adopted in the US within two years. A major revision of the Statistical Manual was made in 1934, to bring it in line with the new Standard. A number of revisions of the Standard were produced, with the last in 1961.

=== Medical 203 (1945) ===
World War II saw the large-scale involvement of U.S. psychiatrists in the selection, processing, assessment, and treatment of soldiers. This moved the focus away from mental institutions and traditional clinical perspectives. The U.S. armed forces initially used the Standard, but found it lacked appropriate categories for many common conditions that troubled troops. The United States Navy made some minor revisions but "the Army established a much more sweeping revision, abandoning the basic outline of the Standard and attempting to express present-day concepts of mental disturbance."

Under the direction of James Forrestal, a committee headed by psychiatrist Brigadier General William C. Menninger, with the assistance of the Mental Hospital Service, developed a new classification scheme in 1944 and 1945.

Issued in War Department Technical Bulletin, Medical, 203 (TB MED 203); Nomenclature and Method of Recording Diagnoses was released shortly after the war in October 1945 under the auspices of the Office of the Surgeon General. It was reprinted in the Journal of Clinical Psychology for civilian use in July 1946 with the new title Nomenclature of Psychiatric Disorders and Reactions. This system came to be known as "Medical 203".

This nomenclature eventually was adopted by all the armed forces, and "assorted modifications of the Armed Forces nomenclature [were] introduced into many clinics and hospitals by psychiatrists returning from military duty." The Veterans Administration also adopted a slightly modified version of the standard in 1947.

The further developed Joint Armed Forces Nomenclature and Method of Recording Psychiatric Conditions was released in 1949.

=== ICD-6 (1948) ===
In 1948, the newly formed World Health Organization took over the maintenance of the ILCD. They greatly expanded it, included non-fatal conditions for the first time, and renamed it the International Statistical Classification of Diseases (ICD). The foreword to the DSM-I states the ICD-6 "categorized mental disorders in rubrics similar to those of the Armed Forces nomenclature."

== Early versions (20th century) ==
=== DSM-I (1952) ===
The APA Committee on Nomenclature and Statistics was empowered to develop a version of Medical 203 specifically for use in the United States, to standardize the diverse and confused usage of different documents. In 1950, the APA committee undertook a review and consultation. It circulated an adaptation of Medical 203, the Standard's nomenclature, and the VA system's modifications of the Standard to approximately 10% of APA members. 46% of members replied, with 93% approving the changes. After some further revisions, the Diagnostic and Statistical Manual of Mental Disorders was approved in 1951 and published in 1952. The structure and conceptual framework were the same as in Medical 203, and many passages of text were identical. The manual was 130 pages long and listed 106 mental disorders. These included several categories of "personality disturbance", generally distinguished from "neurosis" (nervousness, egodystonic).

The foreword to this edition describes itself as being a continuation of the Statistical Manual for the Use of Hospitals of Mental Diseases. Each item was given an ICD-6 equivalent code, where applicable.

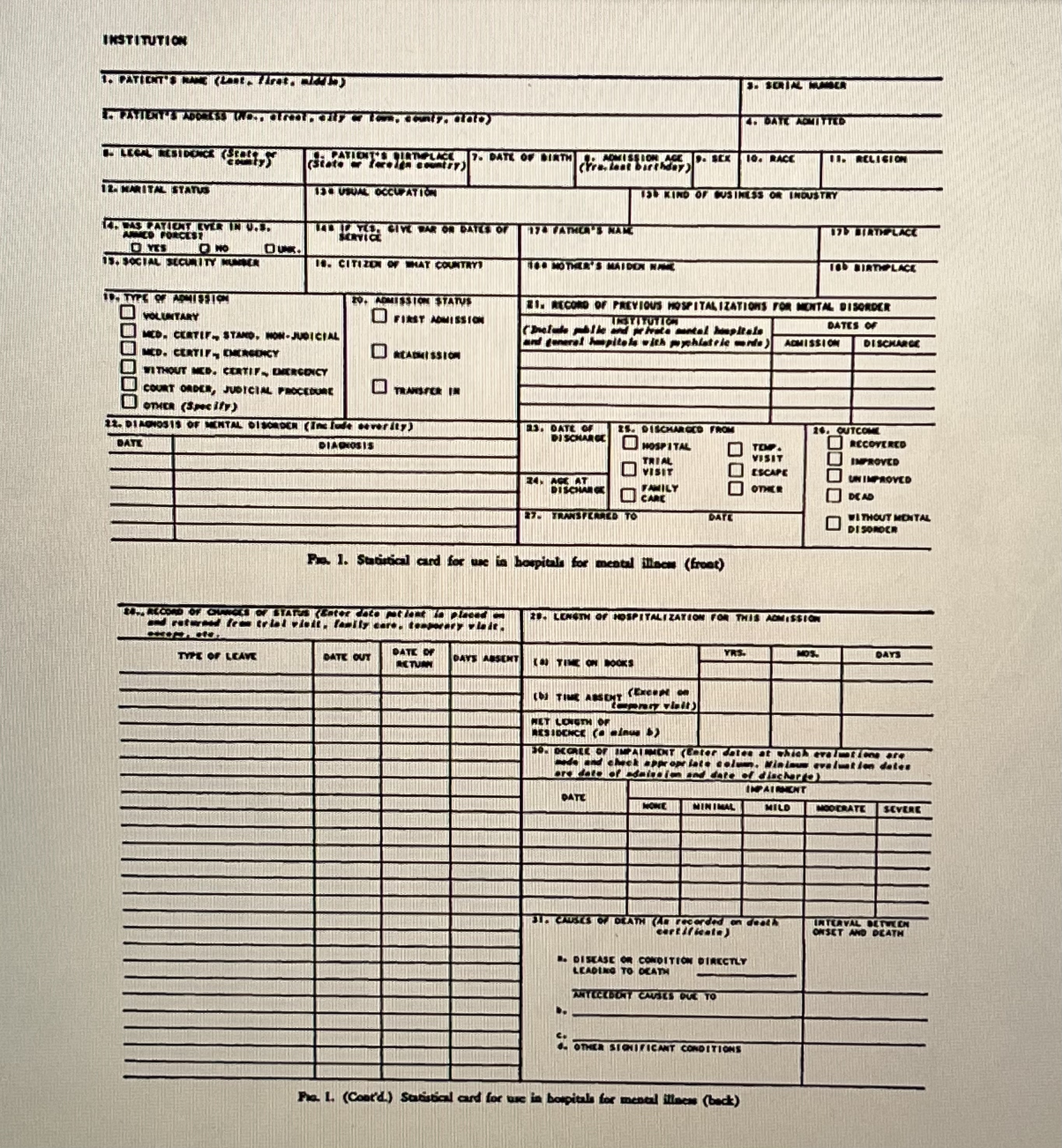
Statistical card for use in hospitals for mental illness

The DSM-I centers on three classes of symptoms: psychotic, neurotic, and behavioral. Within each class of mental disorder, classifying information is provided to differentiate conditions with similar symptoms. Under each broad class of disorder (e.g. "Psychoneurotic Disorders" or "Personality Disorders"), all possible diagnoses are listed, generally from least to most severe. The 1952 DSM version also includes sections detailing how to record patients' disorders along with their demographic details. The form includes information like a patient's area of residence, admission status, discharge date/condition, and severity of disorder. See Figure 1. for the form that psychiatrists were asked to utilize for recording preliminary diagnostic information.

Furthermore, the APA listed homosexuality in the DSM as a sociopathic personality disturbance. Homosexuality: A Psychoanalytic Study of Male Homosexuals, a large-scale 1962 study of homosexuality by Irving Bieber and other authors, was used to justify inclusion of the disorder as a supposed pathological hidden fear of the opposite sex caused by traumatic parent–child relationships. This view was influential in the medical profession. In 1956, however, the psychologist Evelyn Hooker performed a study comparing the happiness and well-adjusted nature of self-identified homosexual men with heterosexual men and found no difference. Her study stunned the medical community and made her a heroine to many gay men and lesbians, but homosexuality remained in the DSM until May 1974.

=== DSM-II (1968) ===
In the 1960s, there were many challenges to the concept of mental illness itself. These challenges came from psychiatrists like Thomas Szasz, who argued mental illness was a myth used to disguise moral conflicts; from sociologists such as Erving Goffman, who said mental illness was another example of how society labels and controls non-conformists; from behavioural psychologists who challenged psychiatry's fundamental reliance on unobservable phenomena; and from gay rights activists who criticised the APA's listing of homosexuality as a mental disorder.

The APA was closely involved in the next significant revision of the mental disorder section of the ICD (version 8 in 1968). It decided to go ahead with a revision of the DSM, which was published in 1968. DSM-II was similar to DSM-I, listed 182 disorders, and was 134 pages long. The term "reaction" was dropped, but the term "neurosis" was retained. Both the DSM-I and the DSM-II reflected the predominant psychodynamic psychiatry, although both manuals also included biological perspectives and concepts from Kraepelin's system of classification. Symptoms were not specified in detail for specific disorders. Many were seen as reflections of broad underlying conflicts or maladaptive reactions to life problems that were rooted in a distinction between neurosis and psychosis (in current terms, personality disorders, i.e. patients in touch with reality, as opposed to hallucinations or delusions disconnected from reality). Sociological and biological knowledge was incorporated, under a model that did not emphasize a clear boundary between normality and abnormality. The idea that personality disorders did not involve emotional distress was discarded.

A study published in Science in 1973, the Rosenhan experiment, received much publicity and was viewed as an attack on the efficacy of psychiatric diagnosis. An influential 1974 paper by Robert Spitzer and Joseph L. Fleiss demonstrated that the second edition of the DSM (DSM-II) was an unreliable diagnostic tool. Spitzer and Fleiss found that different practitioners using the DSM-II rarely agreed when diagnosing patients with similar problems. In reviewing previous studies of eighteen major diagnostic categories, Spitzer and Fleiss concluded that "there are no diagnostic categories for which reliability is uniformly high. Reliability appears to be only satisfactory for three categories: mental deficiency, organic brain syndrome (but not its subtypes), and alcoholism. The level of reliability is no better than fair for psychosis and schizophrenia and is poor for the remaining categories".

==== Seventh printing of the DSM-II (1974) ====
As described by Ronald Bayer, a psychiatrist and gay rights activist, specific protests by gay rights activists against the APA began in 1970, when the organization held its convention in San Francisco. The activists disrupted the conference by interrupting speakers and shouting down and ridiculing psychiatrists who viewed homosexuality as a mental disorder. In 1971, gay rights activist Frank Kameny worked with the Gay Liberation Front collective to demonstrate at the APA's convention. At the 1971 conference, Kameny grabbed the microphone and yelled: "Psychiatry is the enemy incarnate. Psychiatry has waged a relentless war of extermination against us. You may take this as a declaration of war against you."

This gay activism occurred in the context of a broader anti-psychiatry movement that had come to the fore in the 1960s and was challenging the legitimacy of psychiatric diagnosis. Anti-psychiatry activists protested at the same APA conventions, with some shared slogans and intellectual foundations as gay activists.

Taking into account data from researchers such as Alfred Kinsey and Evelyn Hooker, the seventh printing of the DSM-II, in 1974, no longer listed homosexuality as a category of disorder. (Note: Determining the correct DSM-II printing where the change occurred can be confusing because the American Psychiatric Association publication that announced the change is titled, in part, "Proposed change in DSM-II, 6th printing, page 44". However, a notice in that publication indicates that "the change appears on page 44 of this, the seventh printing.") After a vote by the APA trustees in 1973, and confirmed by the wider APA membership in 1974, the diagnosis was replaced with the category of "sexual orientation disturbance".

=== DSM-III (1980) ===
The emergence of DSM-III represented a "quantum leap" in terms of the scale and reach of the manual. In 1974, the decision to revise the DSM was made, and psychiatrist Robert Spitzer was selected as chair of the task force. The initial impetus was to make the DSM nomenclature consistent with that of the International Classification of Diseases (ICD). The revision took on a far wider mandate under the influence and control of Spitzer and his chosen committee members. One added goal was to improve the uniformity and validity of psychiatric diagnosis in the wake of a number of critiques, including the famous Rosenhan experiment. There was also felt a need to standardize diagnostic practices within the United States and with other countries, after research showed that psychiatric diagnoses differed between Europe and the United States. The establishment of consistent criteria was an attempt to facilitate the pharmaceutical regulatory process.

The criteria adopted for many of the mental disorders were influenced by the Research Diagnostic Criteria (RDC) and Feighner Criteria, which had just been developed by a group of research-orientated psychiatrists based primarily at Washington University School of Medicine and the New York State Psychiatric Institute. However, the influence of clinical psychiatrists, themselves often working with psychoanalytic ideas, were still strong. Other criteria, and potential new categories of disorder, were established by debate, argument and consensus during meetings of the committee chaired by Spitzer. A key aim was to base categorization on colloquial English (which would be easier to use by federal administrative offices), rather than by assumption of cause, although its categorical approach still assumed each particular pattern of symptoms in a category reflected a particular underlying pathology (an approach described as "neo-Kraepelinian"). The psychodynamic view was marginalised, although still influential, in favor of a regulatory or legislative model that emphasised observable symptoms. A new "multiaxial" system attempted to yield a picture more amenable to a statistical population census, rather than a simple diagnosis. Spitzer argued "mental disorders are a subset of medical disorders", but the task force decided on this statement for the DSM: "Each of the mental disorders is conceptualized as a clinically significant behavioral or psychological syndrome." Personality disorders were placed on axis II along with "mental retardation".

The first draft of DSM-III was ready within a year. It introduced many new categories of disorder, while deleting or changing others. A number of unpublished documents discussing and justifying the changes have recently come to light. Field trials sponsored by the U.S. National Institute of Mental Health (NIMH) were conducted between 1977 and 1979 to test the reliability of the new diagnoses. A controversy emerged regarding deletion of the concept of neurosis, a mainstream of psychoanalytic theory and therapy but seen as vague and unscientific by the DSM task force. Faced with enormous political opposition, DSM-III was in serious danger of not being approved by the APA Board of Trustees unless "neurosis" was included in some form; a political compromise reinserted the term in parentheses after the word "disorder" in some cases. Additionally, the diagnosis of ego-dystonic homosexuality replaced the DSM-II category of "sexual orientation disturbance". The gender identity disorder in children (GIDC) diagnosis was introduced in the DSM-III; prior to the DSM-III's publication in 1980, there was no diagnostic criteria for gender dysphoria. The term "postpartum" was removed as psychiatrists dismissed the idea of mental illnesses associated with childbearing.

Finally published in 1980, DSM-III listed 265 diagnostic categories and was 494 pages long. It rapidly came into widespread international use and has been termed a revolution, or transformation, in psychiatry.

When DSM-III was published, the developers made extensive claims about the reliability of the radically new diagnostic system they had devised, which relied on data from special field trials. However, according to a 1994 article by Stuart A. Kirk:

Twenty years after the reliability problem became the central focus of DSM-III, there is still not a single multi-site study showing that DSM (any version) is routinely used with high reliably by regular mental health clinicians. Nor is there any credible evidence that any version of the manual has greatly increased its reliability beyond the previous version. There are important methodological problems that limit the generalizability of most reliability studies. Each reliability study is constrained by the training and supervision of the interviewers, their motivation and commitment to diagnostic accuracy, their prior skill, the homogeneity of the clinical setting in regard to patient mix and base rates, and the methodological rigor achieved by the investigator ...

=== DSM-III-R (1987) ===
In 1987, DSM-III-R was published as a revision of the DSM-III, under the direction of Spitzer. Categories were renamed and reorganized, with significant changes in criteria. Six categories were deleted while others were added. Controversial diagnoses, such as Premenstrual Dysphoric Disorder and Masochistic Personality Disorder, were considered and discarded. (Premenstrual Dysphoric Disorder was later reincorporated in the DSM-5, published in 2013). "Ego-dystonic homosexuality" was also removed and was largely subsumed under "sexual disorder not otherwise specified", which could include "persistent and marked distress about one's sexual orientation." Altogether, the DSM-III-R contained 292 diagnoses and was 567 pages long. Further efforts were made for the diagnoses to be purely descriptive, although the introductory text stated for at least some disorders, "particularly the Personality Disorders, the criteria require much more inference on the part of the observer" [page xxiii].

=== DSM-IV (1994) ===
In 1994, DSM-IV was published, listing 410 disorders in 886 pages. The task force was chaired by Allen Frances and was overseen by a steering committee of twenty-seven people, including four psychologists. The steering committee created thirteen work groups of five to sixteen members, each work group having about twenty advisers in addition. The work groups conducted a three-step process: first, each group conducted an extensive literature review of their diagnoses; then, they requested data from researchers, conducting analyses to determine which criteria required change, with instructions to be conservative; finally, they conducted multi-center field trials relating diagnoses to clinical practice. A major change from previous versions was the inclusion of a clinical-significance criterion to almost half of all the categories, which required symptoms causing "clinically significant distress or impairment in social, occupational, or other important areas of functioning". Some personality-disorder diagnoses were deleted or moved to the appendix. "Postpartum" was added as a specifier for some diagnoses.

==== DSM-IV definitions ====
The DSM-IV characterizes a mental disorder as "a clinically significant behavioral or psychological syndrome or pattern that occurs in an individual and that is associated with present distress or disability or with a significant increased risk of suffering death, pain, disability, or an important loss of freedom". It also notes that "although this manual provides a classification of mental disorders it must be admitted that no definition adequately specifies precise boundaries for the concept of 'mental disorder."

==== DSM-IV categorization ====
The DSM-IV is a categorical classification system. The categories are prototypes, and a patient with a close approximation to the prototype is said to have that disorder. DSM-IV states, "there is no assumption each category of mental disorder is a completely discrete entity with absolute boundaries" but isolated, low-grade, and non-criterion (unlisted for a given disorder) symptoms are not given importance. Qualifiers are sometimes used: for example, to specify mild, moderate, or severe forms of a disorder. For nearly half the disorders, symptoms must be sufficient to cause "clinically significant distress or impairment in social, occupational, or other important areas of functioning", although DSM-IV-TR removed the distress criterion from tic disorders and several of the paraphilias due to their egosyntonic nature. Each category of disorder has a numeric code taken from the ICD coding system, used for health service (including insurance) administrative purposes.

==== DSM-IV multi-axial system ====
The DSM-IV was organized into a five-part axial system:

1. Clinical disorders, or any mental condition outside Axis II
2. Personality disorders and what was referred to in DSM editions prior to DSM-5 as "mental retardation"
3. Medical conditions that could impact a person's disorder or treatment of a disorder
4. Psychosocial and environmental factors affecting the person
5. Global assessment of functioning (GAF), which was a numerical score between 0 and 100 that measured how much a person's psychological symptoms impacted their daily life

==== DSM-IV sourcebooks ====
The DSM-IV does not specifically cite its sources, but there are four volumes of "sourcebooks" intended to be APA's documentation of the guideline development process and supporting evidence, including literature reviews, data analyses, and field trials. The sourcebooks have been said to provide important insights into the character and quality of the decisions that led to the production of DSM-IV, and the scientific credibility of contemporary psychiatric classification.

=== DSM-IV-TR (2000) ===
A text revision of DSM-IV, titled DSM-IV-TR, was published in 2000. The diagnostic categories were unchanged as were the diagnostic criteria for all but nine diagnoses. The majority of the text was unchanged; however, the text of two disorders, pervasive developmental disorder not otherwise specified and Asperger's disorder, had significant and/or multiple changes made. An editorial change in DSM-IV's description of PDDNOS had had an unintended effect on the definition of this disorder, which was revised in DSM-IV-TR. The text for Asperger's disorder was practically entirely rewritten. Most other changes were to the associated features sections of diagnoses that contained additional information such as lab findings, demographic information, prevalence, and course. Also, some diagnostic codes were changed to maintain consistency with ICD-9-CM.

== DSM-5 (2013) ==
The fifth edition of the Diagnostic and Statistical Manual of Mental Disorders (DSM), the DSM-5, was approved by the Board of Trustees of the APA on December 1, 2012. Published on May 18, 2013, the DSM-5 contains extensively revised diagnoses and, in some cases, broadens diagnostic definitions while narrowing definitions in other cases. The DSM-5 is the first major edition of the manual in 20 years. DSM-5, and the abbreviations for all previous editions, are registered trademarks owned by the American Psychiatric Association.

A significant change in the fifth edition is the deletion of the subtypes of schizophrenia: paranoid, disorganized, catatonic, undifferentiated, and residual. The deletion of the subsets of autistic spectrum disorder – namely, Asperger's syndrome, classic autism, Rett syndrome, childhood disintegrative disorder and pervasive developmental disorder not otherwise specified – was also implemented, with specifiers regarding intensity: mild, moderate, and severe.

Severity is based on social communication impairments and restricted, repetitive patterns of behavior, with three levels:

1. requiring support
2. requiring substantial support
3. requiring very substantial support

During the revision process, the APA website periodically listed several sections of the DSM-5 for review and discussion.

The National Board of Medical Examiners (NBME), which is responsible for creating and publishing board exams for medical students around the United States, conforms to the use of DSM-5 criteria.

=== Future revisions and updates ===
After the release of the fifth edition, the APA communicated that they intended to add subsequent revisions more often, to keep up with research in the field. It is notable that DSM-5 uses Arabic rather than Roman numerals. Beginning with DSM-5, the APA planned to use decimals to identify incremental updates (e.g., DSM-5.1, DSM-5.2) (Note: However, this planned change was not adopted for the initial revision of the DSM-5, which is named DSM-5-TR, in accordance with past convention.) and whole numbers for new editions (e.g., DSM-5, DSM-6), similar to the scheme used for software versioning.

=== DSM-5-TR (2022) ===
A revision of DSM-5, titled DSM-5-TR (for "Text Revision"), was published in March 2022, updating diagnostic criteria and ICD-10-CM codes. The diagnostic criteria for avoidant/restrictive food intake disorder was changed, along with adding entries for prolonged grief disorder, unspecified mood disorder and stimulant-induced mild neurocognitive disorder. Prolonged grief disorder, which had been present in the ICD-11, had criteria agreed upon by consensus in a one day in-person workshop sponsored by the APA. A 2022 study found that higher rates of diagnosis of prolonged grief disorder in the ICD-11 could be explained by the DSM-5-TR criteria requiring symptoms persist for 12 months, and the ICD-11 requiring only 6 months.

Three review groups for sex and gender, culture and suicide, along with an "ethnoracial equity and inclusion work group" were involved in the creation of the DSM-5-TR which led to additional sections for each mental disorder discussing sex and gender, racial and cultural variations, and adding diagnostic codes for specifying levels of suicidality and nonsuicidal self-injury for mental disorders.

Other changed disorders included:

- Autism spectrum disorder
- Bipolar I disorder, Bipolar II disorder, and related bipolar disorders
- Obsessive–compulsive personality disorder in the alternative DSM-5 model for personality disorders
- Depressive episodes with short-duration hypomania
- Intellectual developmental disorder
- Delusional disorder
- Disruptive mood dysregulation disorder
- Brief psychotic disorder

== DSM Library ==
The APA have supplemented the DSM with supporting works, collectively forming the "DSM Library." As of 2022, the other books in the library are "DSM-5 Handbook of Differential Diagnosis", "DSM-5 Clinical Cases", "DSM-5 Handbook on the Cultural Formulation Interview" and "Guía De Consulta De Los Criterios Diagnósticos Del DSM-5".

== Future sixth edition ==
A "finalized" version of DSM 6 is expected in 2030. Three subcommittees will improve different aspects of the DSM. A fourth subcommittee, the biomarkers subcommittee, will conduct research into the 'biological signs' of mental health conditions. Only general neurobiology will be incorporated into the DSM 6.

== Criticisms ==
Many criticisms have been leveled against the DSM and its usefulness as a diagnostic manual.

=== Reliability and validity ===
The revisions of the DSM from the 3rd Edition forward have been mainly concerned with diagnostic reliability – the degree to which different diagnosticians agree on a diagnosis. Henrik Walter argued that psychiatry as a science can only advance if diagnosis is reliable. If clinicians and researchers frequently disagree about the diagnosis of a patient, then research into the causes and effective treatments of those disorders cannot advance. Hence, diagnostic reliability was a major concern of DSM-III. When the diagnostic reliability problem was thought to be solved, subsequent editions of the DSM were concerned mainly with "tweaking" the diagnostic criteria. Neither the issue of reliability or validity was settled.

In 2013, shortly before the publication of DSM-5, the director of the National Institute of Mental Health (NIMH), Thomas R. Insel, declared that the agency would no longer fund research projects that relied exclusively on DSM diagnostic criteria, due to its lack of validity. Insel questioned the validity of the DSM classification scheme because "diagnoses are based on a consensus about clusters of clinical symptoms" as opposed to "collecting the genetic, imaging, physiologic, and cognitive data to see how all the data – not just the symptoms – cluster and how these clusters relate to treatment response."

Field trials of DSM-5 brought the debate of reliability back into the limelight, as the diagnoses of some disorders showed poor reliability. For example, a diagnosis of major depressive disorder, a common mental illness, had a poor reliability kappa statistic of 0.28, indicating that clinicians frequently disagreed on diagnosing this disorder in the same patients. The most reliable diagnosis was major neurocognitive disorder, with a kappa of 0.78.

=== Diagnosis based on superficial symptoms ===
By design, the DSM is primarily concerned with the signs and symptoms of mental disorders, rather than the underlying causes. It claims to collect these disorders based on statistical or clinical patterns. As such, it has been compared to a naturalist's field guide to birds, with similar advantages and disadvantages. The lack of a causative or explanatory basis, however, is not specific to the DSM, but rather reflects a general lack of pathophysiological understanding of psychiatric disorders. Proponents argue this absence of explanatory classification is necessary, but it presents a problem for researchers as it results in the grouping of individuals who may have little in common except superficial criteria. As DSM-III chief architect Robert Spitzer and DSM-IV editor Michael First outlined in 2005, "little progress has been made toward understanding the pathophysiological processes and cause of mental disorders. If anything, the research has shown the situation is even more complex than initially imagined, and we believe not enough is known to structure the classification of psychiatric disorders according to etiology."

While there is generally a lack of consensus on underlying causation for most psychiatric disorders, some proponents of specific psychopathological paradigms have faulted the DSM for failing to incorporate evidence from other disciplines. For instance, evolutionary psychology distinguishes between genuine cognitive malfunctions and malfunctions due to psychological adaptations (that is learned behaviors may be adaptive in one context but maladaptive in another). However, this distinction is one that is challenged within general psychology.

There is also criticism of the strong operationalist viewpoint of the DSM. The DSM relies on operational definitions, which means that intuitive concepts like depression are defined by specific measurable criteria (observable behavior, specific timelines). Some have argued that instead of replacing metaphysical terms like "desire" or "purpose" the DSM chose to legitimize them by giving them operational definitions. However, this may have served only to provide a "reassurance fetish" for mainstream methodological practice, rather than representing a substantial and meaningful alteration of mainstream psychiatric practice.

A central problem with the use of superficial symptoms is that psychiatry deals with the phenomena of consciousness, which adds much more complexity than the somatic symptoms and signs used by most of medicine. A 2013 review published in the European Archives of Psychiatry and Clinical Neuroscience gives the example of the problem of superficial characterization of psychiatric signs and symptoms. If a patient says they "feel depressed, sad, or down" there are actually a wide variety of underlying experiences they could be referencing: "not only depressed mood but also, for instance, irritation, anger, loss of meaning, varieties of fatigue, ambivalence, ruminations of different kinds, hyper-reflectivity, thought pressure, psychological anxiety, varieties of depersonalization, and even voices with negative content, and so forth." This criticism is especially pertinent to the structured interview, as simple "yes or no" questions may not be specific enough to truly confirm or deny the diagnostic criterion at issue. That is, whether a patient says yes or no will rely on their own understanding of the meaning of the various words in the question as well as their own interpretation of their experience. There is thus danger in being overconfident in the face value of the answers. The authors of the 2013 review give an example: A patient who was being administered the Structured Clinical Interview for the DSM-IV Axis I Disorders denied thought insertion, but during a "conversational, phenomenological interview", a semi-structured interview tailored to the patient, the same patient admitted to experiencing thought insertion, along with a delusional elaboration. The authors suggested 2 reasons for this discrepancy: either the patient did not "recognize his own experience in the rather blunt, implicitly either/or formulation of the structured-interview question", or the experience did not "fully articulate itself" until the patient started talking about his experiences.

=== Obscuring root causes ===
==== Economic causes ====
The DSM-5 has been criticized for overlooking capitalism's interconnectivity with pathology. One example is the development and treatment of diagnoses: around 69% of psychiatrists involved in the development of the DSM-5 were reported to have financial ties to the pharmaceutical industry. These ties situate many care services within the medical-industrial complex, a framework that prioritizes profit instead of the care of individuals. Lane found the medical-industrial complex intertwined with setting the parameters to diagnose conditions such as social anxiety disorder. Other authors have supported similar findings. Kincaid and Sullivan estimate that the cost of the industry surrounding diagnosis will rise to around six trillion dollars by 2030.

Scholars differ in the extent of capitalism's influence on diagnosis. Davies supports the social model of disability in explaining that diagnosis at present relies on considering conditions a consequence of a "broken brain." His wider logic on mental illness in response to societal issues problematizes diagnosis as a tool of the medical-industrial complex. His previous book, Cracked, demonstrates the market interactions within the medical-industrial complex, as diagnosis becomes a source for monetization.

Others find that the dependency of patients on their psychiatric care providers makes the industry vulnerable to economic exploitation under capitalism. These individuals argue that diagnosis is manipulated, but not caused, by capitalistic forces. Academics have critiqued the directness of the association between the medical model, capitalism, and diagnosis, but generally agree that characteristics of the capitalist system contribute to poor mental health.

==== Institutional causes ====
Diagnoses of mental conditions have been used to obscure institutional practices of discrimination. Late nineteenth-century diagnoses of white women with hysteria, for instance, were said to be caused by "overcivilization," shaped by racially discriminatory Social Darwinism. Similarly, American physician Samuel Cartwright coined "drapetomania" in 1851 as a mental condition which "caused" slaves to escape captivity. In the present day, Brinkmann finds that "contemporary diagnostic cultures," whereby humans assess their conditions through a psychiatric lens, can "risk losing sight of the larger historical and social forces that affect [their] lives." Contemporary diagnostic cultures help explain how diagnosis reflect larger historical biases.

Critics have argued that the DSM-5's criteria pathologize a wide range of people with distress or impairment. Chapman et al. discuss the implications for obscuring distress in the incarceration and confinement of "intellectually disabled" populations; they argue that "differentiation based on psychiatric and intellectual disability" is arbitrarily set and altered based on capitalism's needs for "mobile and free workers." Metzl demonstrates that the shifting diagnostic parameters of schizophrenia became a method for institutionalizing Black men during the Civil Rights Movement. In sum, those who have experienced "domination" or "exploitation" based on an identity trait are more likely to be pathologized through diagnosis.

=== Overdiagnosis ===
Allen Frances, an outspoken critic of DSM-5, states that "normality is an endangered species," because of "fad diagnoses" and an "epidemic" of over-diagnosing, and suggests that the "DSM-5 threatens to provoke several more [epidemics]." Some researchers state that changes in diagnostic criteria, following each published version of the DSM, reduce thresholds for a diagnosis, which results in increases in prevalence rates for ADHD and autism spectrum disorder. Bruchmüller, et al. (2012) suggest that as a factor that may lead to overdiagnosis are situations when the clinical judgment of the diagnostician regarding a diagnosis (ADHD) is affected by heuristics.

=== Arbitrary categorization of disorders ===
==== Dividing lines between each disorder ====
Despite caveats in the introduction to the DSM, it has long been argued that its system of classification makes unjustified categorical distinctions between disorders and uses arbitrary cut-offs between normal and abnormal. A 2009 psychiatric review noted that attempts to demonstrate natural boundaries between related DSM syndromes, or between a common DSM syndrome and normality, have failed. Some argue that rather than a categorical approach, a fully dimensional, spectrum or complaint-oriented approach would better reflect the evidence.

In addition, it is argued that the current approach based on exceeding a threshold of symptoms does not adequately take into account the context in which a person is living, and to what extent there is internal disorder of an individual versus a psychological response to adverse situations. The DSM does include a step ("Axis IV") for outlining "Psychosocial and environmental factors contributing to the disorder" once someone is diagnosed with that particular disorder.

Because an individual's degree of impairment is often not correlated with symptom counts and can stem from various individual and social factors, the DSM's standard of distress or disability can often produce false positives. On the other hand, individuals who do not meet symptom counts may nevertheless experience comparable distress or disability in their life.

==== Axis I/II distinction, and discontinuation of the axial system in DSM 5 ====
In 2013, the DSM 5 was published without an axial system. Psychiatrist Allen Frances previously expressed concern similar to, "eliminating the structured approach for gathering and organizing clinical assessment data will hinder clinical practice".

Prior to the publication of DSM 5, two factor models of DSM-IV disorders were published. The four factor model by Roysamb and others (2011) identified factors which they named Internalizing, Externalizing, Cognitive-Relational Disturbance, and Anhedonic Introversion. Additionally, the four factor model places Borderline Personality Disorder and Depressive Personality Disorder at the intersection of different factors i.e. estimates cross loadings between different factors onto these disorders. After Roysamb and others, Keyes and others (2012) approximately replicated the Internalizing/Externalizing distinction in their factor model. The exception was in placing Dysthymia with Internalizing disorders. In contrast to Roysamb and others, the only personality disorder included in Keyes and others' analysis was Anti-Social Personality Disorder; no other personality disorders were included.

=== Cultural bias ===
Psychiatrists have argued that published diagnostic standards rely on an exaggerated interpretation of neurophysiological findings and so understate the scientific importance of social-psychological variables. Advocating a more culturally sensitive approach to psychology, critics such as Carl Bell and Marcello Maviglia contend that researchers and service-providers often discount the cultural and ethnic diversity of individuals. In addition, current diagnostic guidelines have been criticized as having a fundamentally Euro-American outlook. Although these guidelines have been widely implemented, opponents argue that even when a diagnostic criterion-set is accepted across different cultures, it does not necessarily indicate that the underlying constructs have any validity within those cultures; even reliable application can only demonstrate consistency, not legitimacy. Cross-cultural psychiatrist Arthur Kleinman contends that Western bias is ironically illustrated in the introduction of cultural factors to the DSM-IV: the fact that disorders or concepts from non-Western or non-mainstream cultures are described as "culture-bound", whereas standard psychiatric diagnoses are given no cultural qualification whatsoever, is to Kleinman revelatory of an underlying assumption that Western cultural phenomena are universal. Other cross-cultural critics largely share Kleinman's negative view toward the culture-bound syndrome, common responses included both disappointment over the large number of documented non-Western mental disorders still left out, and frustration that even those included were often misinterpreted or misrepresented.

Mainstream psychiatrists have also been dissatisfied with these new culture-bound diagnoses, although not for the same reasons. Robert Spitzer, a lead architect of DSM-III, has held the opinion that the addition of cultural formulations was an attempt to placate cultural critics, and that they lack any scientific motivation or support. Spitzer also posits that the new culture-bound diagnoses are rarely used in practice, maintaining that the standard diagnoses apply regardless of the culture involved. In general, the mainstream psychiatric opinion remains that if a diagnostic category is valid, cross-cultural factors are either irrelevant or are only significant to specific symptom presentations.

Historically, the DSM tended to avoid issues involving religion; the DSM-5 relaxed this attitude somewhat.

=== Medicalization and financial conflicts of interest ===
There was extensive analysis and comment on DSM-IV (published in 1994) in the years leading up to the 2013 publication of DSM-5. It was alleged that the way the categories of DSM-IV were structured, as well as the substantial expansion of the number of categories within it, represented increasing medicalization of human nature, very possibly attributable to disease mongering by psychiatrists and pharmaceutical companies, the power and influence of the latter having grown dramatically in recent decades. In 2005, then APA President Steven Sharfstein released a statement in which he conceded that psychiatrists had "allowed the biopsychosocial model to become the bio-bio-bio model". It was reported that of the authors who selected and defined the DSM-IV psychiatric disorders, roughly half had financial relationships with the pharmaceutical industry during the period 1989–2004, raising the prospect of a direct conflict of interest. The same article concluded that the connections between panel members and the drug companies were particularly strong involving those diagnoses where drugs are the first line of treatment, such as schizophrenia and mood disorders, where 100% of the panel members had financial ties with the pharmaceutical industry.

William Glasser referred to DSM-IV as having "phony diagnostic categories", arguing that "it was developed to help psychiatrists – to help them make money". A 2012 article in The New York Times commented sharply that DSM-IV (then in its 18th year), through copyrights held closely by the APA, had earned the Association over $100 million.

However, although the number of identified diagnoses had increased by more than 200% (from 106 in DSM-I to 365 in DSM-IV-TR), psychiatrists such as Zimmerman and Spitzer argued that this almost entirely represented greater specification of the forms of pathology, thereby allowing better grouping of similar patients.

=== Potential harm of labels ===
A core function of the DSM is the categorization of people's experiences into diagnoses based on symptoms. However, there is disagreement about the use of diagnoses as labels. Some individuals are relieved to find they have a recognized condition that they can apply a name to, and this has led to many people self-diagnosing. Others, however, question the accuracy of diagnosis, or feel they have been given a label that invites social stigma and discrimination (the terms "mentalism" and "sanism" have been used to describe such discriminatory treatment).

Diagnoses can become internalized and affect an individual's self-identity, and some psychotherapists have found that the healing process can be inhibited and symptoms can worsen as a result. Some members of the psychiatric survivors movement (more broadly the consumer/survivor/ex-patient movement) actively campaign against their diagnoses, or the assumed implications, or against the DSM system in general. Additionally, it has been noted that the DSM often uses definitions and terminology that are inconsistent with a recovery model, and such content can erroneously imply excess psychopathology (e.g. multiple "comorbid" diagnoses) or chronicity.

=== Critiques of DSM-5 ===
Psychiatrist Allen Frances has been critical of proposed revisions to the DSM–5. In a 2012 New York Times editorial, Frances warned that if this DSM version is issued unamended by the APA, "it will medicalize normality and result in a glut of unnecessary and harmful drug prescription."

In a December 2012, blog post on Psychology Today, Frances provides his "list of DSM 5's ten most potentially harmful changes:"

- Disruptive Mood Dysregulation Disorder, for temper tantrums
- Major Depressive Disorder, includes normal grief
- Minor Neurocognitive Disorder, for normal forgetfulness in old age
- Adult Attention Deficit Disorder, encouraging psychiatric prescriptions of stimulants
- Binge Eating Disorder, for excessive eating
- Autism, defining the disorder more specifically, possibly leading to decreased rates of diagnosis and the disruption of school services
- First-time drug users will be lumped in with addicts
- Behavioral Addictions, making a "mental disorder of everything we like to do a lot."
- Generalized Anxiety Disorder, includes everyday worries
- Post-traumatic stress disorder, changes "opened the gate even further to the already existing problem of misdiagnosis of PTSD in forensic settings."

A group of 25 psychiatrists and researchers, among whom were Frances and Thomas Szasz, have published debates on what they see as the six most essential questions in psychiatric diagnosis:

- Are they more like theoretical constructs or more like diseases?
- How to reach an agreed definition?
- Should the DSM-5 take a cautious or conservative approach?
- What is the role of practical rather than scientific considerations?
- How should it be used by clinicians or researchers?
- Is an entirely different diagnostic system required?

In 2011, psychologist Brent Robbins co-authored a national letter for the Society for Humanistic Psychology that has brought thousands into the public debate about the DSM. Over 15,000 individuals and mental health professionals have signed a petition in support of the letter. Thirteen other APA divisions have endorsed the petition. Robbins has noted that under the new guidelines, certain responses to grief could be labeled as pathological disorders, instead of being recognized as being normal human experiences.

=== Cultural responses to the DSM ===
There are several works written in recent years by scholars of the disabled community that specifically critique the cultural impact of the DSM-5. These pieces criticize the DSM-5 from different cultural perspectives, integrating the experiences of disabled people identifying as crip, feminists, Asian Americans, Black Americans and other marginalized viewpoints.

==== DSM CRIP ====
DSM CRIP is a collection of essays by various authors that explore the critiques of the DSM-5 from feminist and crip perspectives. These essays tackle the critiques of the DSM using specific diagnoses such as gender dysphoria, transvestic disorder, complex somatic symptom disorder, hypoactive sexual desire disorder, schizophrenia and autism. These are used as case studies to tackle the topics of the potential harm of labels, overmedicalization, overdiagnosis, pathologizing normality and various other critiques informed by the feminist and crip lens.

==== Open in Emergency ====
Open in Emergency is a multimedia collaborative project of the Asian American Literary Review that takes the lens of an Asian American Experience and redefines wellness in terms of care instead of focusing on diagnosis, unlike the original DSM V. This included mock versions of DSM diagnoses such as gender dysphoria, social anxiety disorder and cannabis use disorder that mean to recharacterize the disorders under the lens of wellness and care. The project was said to contextualize mental disorders with their relationship to structures of power like patriarchy, colonialism and violence (here).

==== The Protest Psychosis: How Schizophrenia became a Black disease ====
The Protest Psychosis: How Schizophrenia became a Black disease is a critically acclaimed book that was written to analyze the history of schizophrenia and how perceptions of the condition have changed. In this book, Metzl shows how the condition of schizophrenia was experienced against the backdrop of the Civil Rights Movement. This book was recognized by the Disability Studies Quarterly academic journal as an excellent analysis of schizophrenia's link to black history.

== See also ==
- Chinese Classification and Diagnostic Criteria of Mental Disorders
- Classification of mental disorders
- Diagnostic classification and rating scales used in psychiatry
- DSM-IV codes
- Global Assessment of Functioning (GAF) Scale
- International Statistical Classification of Diseases and Related Health Problems (ICD)
- Kraepelinian dichotomy
- Psychodynamic Diagnostic Manual
- Relational disorder (proposed DSM-5 new diagnosis)
- Research Domain Criteria (RDoC), a framework being developed by the National Institute of Mental Health
- Rosenhan experiment
- Structured Clinical Interview for DSM (SCID)
- Homosexuality in DSM
