= Asian American Literary Review =

American magazine

- Editors-in-Chief: Lawrence-Minh Bὺi Davis and Gerald Maa
- Categories: Literary magazine
- Frequency: Biannually
- Founded: 2010
- Country: United States
- Based in: Fort Washington, Maryland
- Language: English
- Website: www.aalrmag.org

The Asian American Literary Review (AALR) is a biannual literary magazine and according to its official website is "a space for writers who consider the designation 'Asian American' a fruitful starting point for artistic vision and community." It was founded in 2010 by Lawrence-Minh Bὺi Davis, Gerald Maa and Larry Shinagawa, and Davis and Maa currently serve as the editors-in-chief. The magazine publishes fiction, poetry, creative nonfiction, translations, comic art, interviews and book reviews, and is sponsored by Binghamton University in Binghamton, New York.
