= Brockington College =

School in Leicestershire, England

Coordinates: 52.5849°N 1.2038°W

Brockington College Leicester
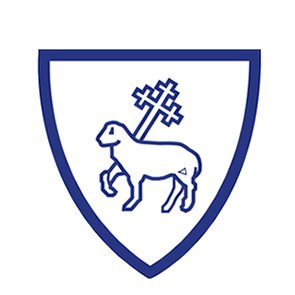
- Enderby, Leicestershire, LE19 4AQ; England

Information
- Type: Academy
- Motto: Learning to live life to the full
- Religious affiliation: Church of England
- Established: 1957
- Local authority: Leicestershire
- Department for Education URN: 138521 Tables
- Ofsted: Reports
- Principal: Jon Barton
- Gender: Mixed
- Age: 11 to 16
- Website: https://brockington.embracemat.org

Brockington College is a mixed Church of England secondary school located in Enderby, Leicestershire, England. Founded in 1957, it originally operated as a middle school for pupils aged 11 to 14 before transitioning to an 11–16 secondary school. The school converted to academy status on 1 August 2012.

== Features ==
=== Admissions ===
Brockington College admits students aged between 11 and 16 years old.

Its catchment area is centered around Enderby, Narborough, Huncote, Croft and Thurlaston.

=== School culture ===
The school's stated values are compassion, forgiveness, justice, koinonia, perseverance, wisdom, learning, and respect.

=== House system ===
As of 2020 the school operates four houses; namely Plantagenet, Stuart, Tudor and Windsor, in which pupils participate in extracurricular and enrichment activities.

== Facilities ==
The original school buildings were completed in 1957 using an inter-grid prefabricated construction method.

The site was redeveloped between September 2006 and September 2007.

An artificial grass football pitch was added in 2009, funded by the Football Association, Next, and local sponsors. Sports facilities, such as the indoor hall and multi-use games area, are open for community hire.
