= Ian Brockington =

British doctor

Ian Brockington (born 1935) is a British psychiatrist.

== Education and career ==
Ian Fraser Brockington was educated at Winchester College and Gonville and Caius College Cambridge. He received his medical training at Manchester University. His doctoral thesis was on 'Heart muscle disease'.

He spent four years in Ibadan, Nigeria, alternating with training posts at the Royal Postgraduate Medical School with Professor Goodwin; this resulted in a number of papers on African heart diseases.

On his return he switched to psychiatry, with training at the Maudsley Hospital. He worked with the late Robert Evan Kendell on schizoaffective disorders and wrote a series of papers on the nosology of the psychoses. As Senior Lecturer at the Victoria University of Manchester he developed an interest in mother–infant psychiatry. After visiting professorships in Chicago and St Louis, he was appointed to the Chair of Psychiatry at the University of Birmingham. There he developed a community-based clinical service for mothers, backed by an inpatient mother and baby unit and day hospital. He had sabbaticals as Cottman Fellow in Monash University, and locum tenens consultant at the mother and baby unit in Christchurch, New Zealand.

== Professional associations ==
He helped to found, and was the first President of, the Marcé Society, and founded the Section on Women's Mental Health in the World Psychiatric Association. He has established three anonymous patient panels: Action on Puerperal Psychosis, Action on Menstrual Psychosis, and Action on Bonding Disorders.

Since his retirement from clinical and university work in 2001, he had visiting professorships in Nagoya (with Professor Honjo) and Kumamoto (with Professor Kitamura).

He chaired a World Psychiatric Association taskforce on child protection.

== Publishing ==
With a hobby of bookbinding, he established Eyry Press. He has written six monographs on the psychiatry of childbearing, four of which he published himself.

Menstrual psychosis is a medical condition that Brockinton proposed for a periodic display of psychosis with acute onset in a particular phase of the menstrual cycle. It is proposed as a form of severe mental illness, whose clinical features resemble those of the common form of postpartum psychosis; since most cases are considered to belong to the bipolar disorder spectrum, it is not a "disease in its own right". According to Brockington, between the early 1800s and the early 2000s, 27 confirmed cases and nearly 200 possible cases of menstruation and brief psychotic episodes happening at the same time have been reported in the medical literature. Episodes of menstrual psychosis have a sudden onset in a previously asymptomatic person, and are usually of brief duration, with full recovery. In most patients, Brockington states that menstrual psychosis is a self-limiting disorder, affecting only a small proportion of the 400 menstrual cycles in a woman’s life.

=== Publications ===
- Brockington IF (1996). Motherhood and Mental Health. Oxford Medical Publications, Oxford University Press. ISBN 978-0192629357.
- Brockington IF (2006). Eileithyia's Mischief: the Organic Psychoses of Pregnancy, Parturition and the Puerperium. Bredenbury, Eyry Press. ISBN 0-9540633-2-5.
- Brockington IF (2008). Menstrual Psychosis and the Catamenial Process. Bredenbury, Eyry Press. ISBN 0-9540633-5-X.
- Brockington IF (2014). What is Worth Knowing about 'Puerperal Psychosis'. Bredenbury, Eyry Press. ISBN 0-9540633-7-6.
- Brockington IF (2017). The Psychoses of Menstruation and Childbearing. Cambridge University Press ISBN 978-1107113602.
- Brockington IF (2018). Bonding Disorders: Emotional Rejection of the Infant. Bredenbury, Eyry Press. ISBN 0-9540633-8-4.
