= Miscarriage and mental disorders =

- Specialty: Psychiatry

Mental disorders can be a consequence of miscarriage or early pregnancy loss. Many women can develop long-term psychiatric symptoms after a miscarriage, but acknowledging the potential of mental illness is not usually common. Mental illnesses can develop in women who have experienced three or more miscarriages, in 28 weeks (habitual or recurrent miscarriages). Women can experience mental illness years later. Some data suggest that men and women can be affected up to 15 years after the loss. Though recognized as a public health problem, studies investigating the mental health status of women following miscarriage are still lacking.

Commonly reported mental disorders after miscarriages include posttraumatic stress disorder(PTSD), clinical depression, anxiety, and complicated grief. Risks for developing PTSD after miscarriage include emotional pain, expressions of emotion, and low levels of social support. Even if relatively low levels of stress occur after the miscarriage, symptoms of PTSD, including flashbacks, intrusive thoughts, dissociation, and hyperarousal, can later develop. Clinical depression symptoms can include trouble sleeping, wanting to be alone, loss of interest in activities, and irritability. Past responses by clinicians have been to prescribe sedatives.Anxiety can also develop as a result of a miscarriage. Women describe the medical treatment that they receive as contributing to their distress. Research has shown that a lot of anxiety symptoms may involve persistent obsessive thoughts, including replaying the loss, unwanted worries about another loss, or rumination about potential causes.

Risk factors for developing mental health disorders can also be due to stigma, low social support, and barriers to care. Because of the stigma surrounding miscarriage, barriers to mental healthcare following the loss are created. A lack of social support from family, friends, or their partners can cause women to internalize or suppress emotions surrounding the loss. However, increased social support and adequate treatment from healthcare professionals have been found to mitigate the effects of depression post-miscarriage.Men may also experience pain and psychological effects, but react by adopting "compensatory behaviors" such as increasing consumption of alcohol. Because men can consider their role to be supportive, they may not have their loss recognized.

== Posttraumatic stress disorder ==
Women who have had clinical depression before the miscarriage are more likely to develop PTSD. Posttraumatic stress disorder is associated with miscarriage, along with other traumatic events associated with pregnancy. Those who experience recurrent miscarriage (>3) have a greater risk of developing PTSD than those who have experienced miscarriage once. An association between the gender of the infant lost through miscarriage exists, whereby there is an increased chance of developing PTSD if the infant was a male. Knowing the cause of the miscarriage does not reduce the risk of developing PTSD. Finding a 'meaning' for the loss reduces the risk of developing PTSD. A negative outlook regarding the world in general is correlated with increased levels of PTSD. Poor self-esteem is also related to developing PTSD after the loss. If memories of the loss are considered intense, risk for PTSD is increased. There are concerns that PTSD in mothers may have a negative impact on children born after the event.

Though the development of PTSD in women and families after the loss has been identified, the presence of PTSD in a woman who is pregnant is detrimental. Women with PTSD are thought to be at a higher risk of prenatal loss, perinatal loss, pregnancy complications, ectopic pregnancy, preterm birth, and growth abnormalities in the fetus.

PTSD in a mother is suspected to increase the risk of autism, hypertension, cardiovascular diseases, and type 2 diabetes in a child.

== Depression and anxiety ==
Depression and anxiety are frequently reported symptoms in women following miscarriages. Women who miscarry have double the risk of being clinically diagnosed with a depressive or anxiety disorder compared to women who have not experienced such a loss. And about 43% of women who miscarry are diagnosed with depression and anxiety disorders. There is also an increased risk of depression for women who have had a previous miscarriage, ranging up to 1.4 times as likely for those with 3 or more miscarriages. This may be due to the psychological impact of the loss itself. Women who experience perinatal loss may experience more intense symptoms and emotional distress that can extend beyond typical reactions and can meet the criteria for psychiatric disorders. A 2025 review of 29 studies from different countries included 35,375 women who experienced miscarriages, they reported that 32.5% of them experienced anxiety symptoms and 30.1% depressive symptoms. The overall prevalence of these depressive symptoms was at 30.7%, although the studies show a wide variation based on geographic regions.

Other factors for depression and anxiety symptoms after a miscarriage include a family history of mental disorders, no children before the miscarriage, and weak support systems.

== Grief ==
Complicated grief is an atypical response to a miscarriage. It differs from the more common form of grief that occurs after a miscarriage. Feelings of guilt, self-blame, and failure can arise and are associated with complicated grief. The grieving process associated with other events, such as the loss of a spouse or parent, is expected to decline at a predictable and steady rate. This differs from those experiencing grief after a miscarriage, as there is an initial spike within six months following the miscarriage, but then it declines slightly in the following months or years. Grief also differs after a miscarriage since it is based on a perceived future as opposed to past events. It is believed that the intensity of grief depends on whether or not it was a wanted pregnancy, as well as the viewing of an ultrasound. A lack of social support from family, friends, partners, and religious communities can increase the intensity and/or longevity of the grief following the loss. Higher levels of grief are also found in those who do not already have children.

Cognitive behavior therapy has been found to be helpful if it is begun immediately after the loss.

== Epidemiology ==
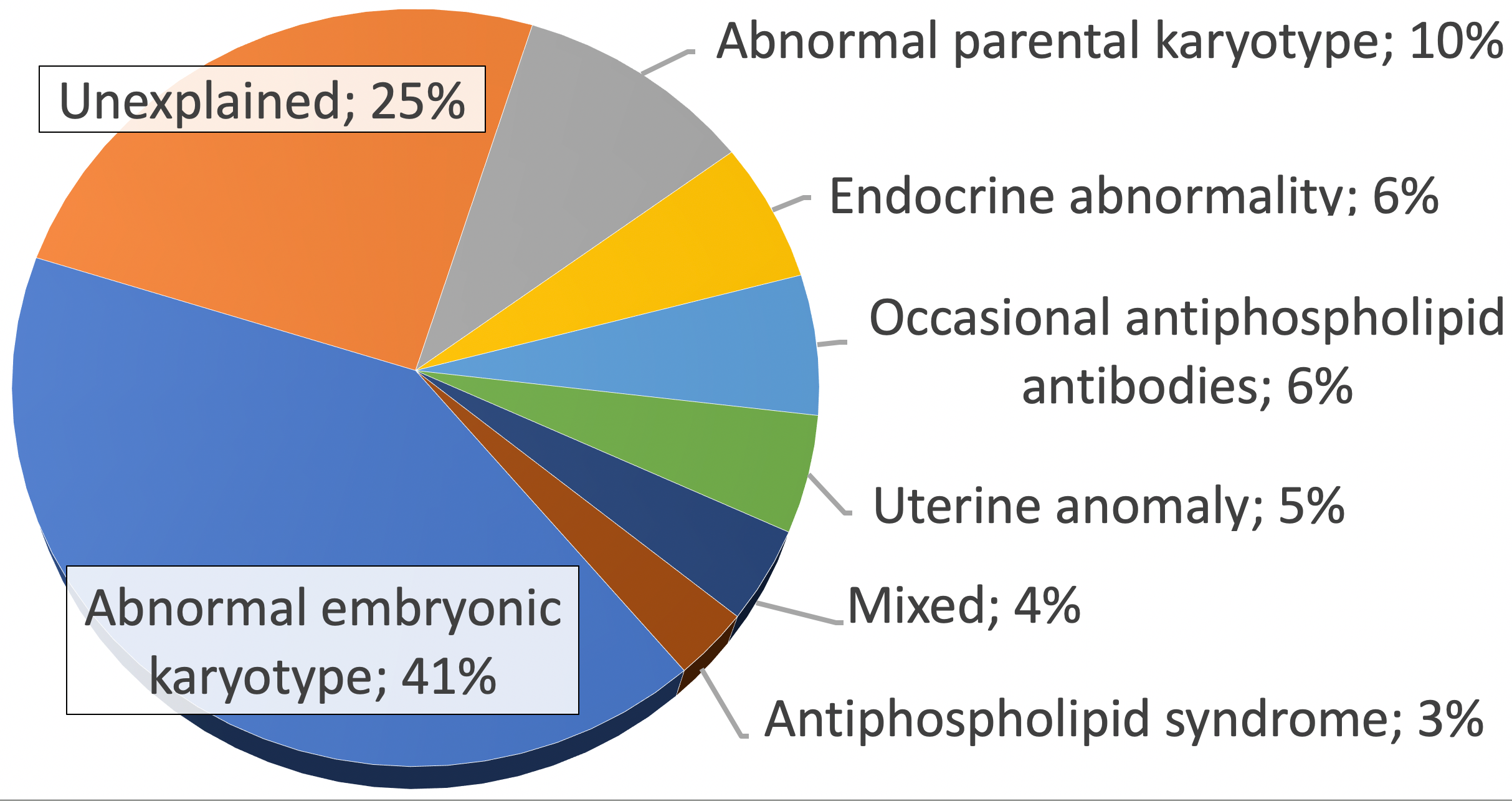
This chart details common causes for recurrent miscarriages.

A woman who miscarries has a 2.5 times greater risk of depression than those who have not. In the US, estimates of PTSD related to miscarriage are thought to be 150,000–200,000 acute and 24,000–32,000 chronic PTSD cases. PTSD in fathers may be significant, but remains unaddressed.

== See also ==
- Abortion and induced abortion
- Miscarriage

== Bibliography ==
- Seftel, Laura (2006). Grief unseen: healing pregnancy loss through the arts. London: Jessica Kingsley Publishers. ISBN 978-1-84310-805-4. OCLC 153919942.
- Martin, Colin (2012). Perinatal Mental Health: a Clinical Guide. Cumbria England: M & K Pub. ISBN 978-1-907830-49-5.
