= Specifier (psychology) =

Diagnostic extension for clarification of disorders

Specifiers are extensions to a diagnosis to further clarify a disorder or illness. They allow for a more specific diagnosis. They are used extensively in the Diagnostic & Statistical Manual of Mental Disorders (DSM-5) primarily in the diagnosis of mood disorders. Specifiers are not mutually exclusive and more than one specifier may be applied on a patient.

== Types of specifier ==
In bipolar disorder, specifiers describe the nature of a current episode, such as the levels of anxiety, melancholia, and psychosis, and whether moods are congruent with behavior or incongruent. They also describe the ongoing nature of recurrent episodes, when they began, how often they occur, and the pattern of re-occurrence. A postpartum onset specifier can be applied in major depressive disorder or bipolar disorder if the onset is within four weeks after childbirth.

== Bibliography ==
- Purse, Marcia (July 5, 2017). "What Are Specifiers in Bipolar Disorder?". Verywell.
- American Psychiatric Association (2013). Diagnostic and Statistical Manual of Mental Disorders. American Psychiatric Publishing.
