= Space pharmacology =

Application of biomedical engineering

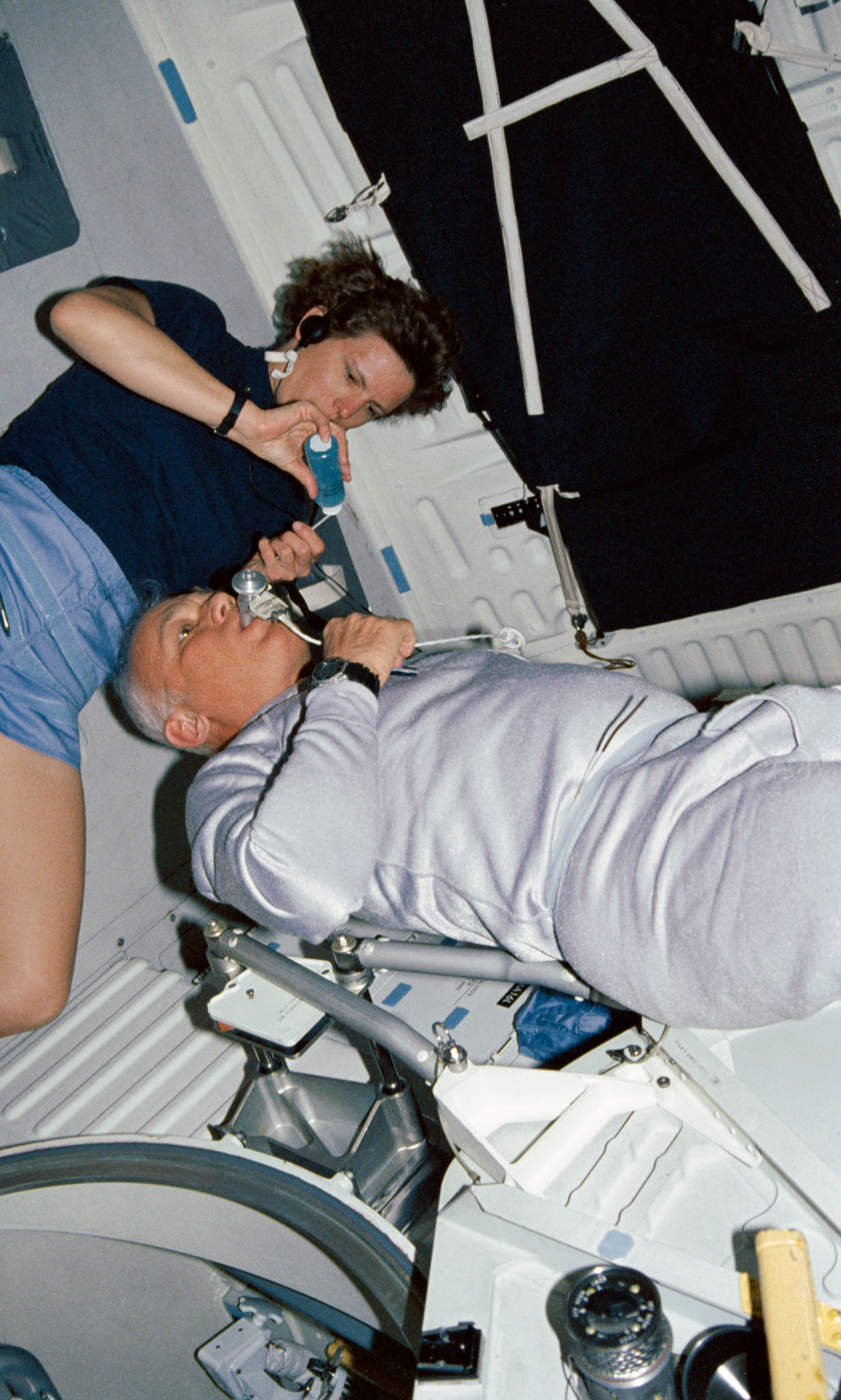
Scientists and astronauts Kathryn D. Sullivan and Bruce McCandless I are performing medical studies on Central Venous Pressure and associated drug-related studies.

Space pharmacology is the application of biomedical engineering that studies the use and dynamics of drugs or pharmaceuticals in space environments. Falling in the realm of space medicine, outer space drug delivery is the practical application of using drugs to treat disorders that may arise due to space's extreme conditions, such as microgravity, radiation, and other physiological and psychological risks. The physical conditions and hazards posed by outer space conditions can result in space-related disorders to the human body, posing a necessity to manufacture, modify, and test drugs to work in outer space.

== History of space medicine and drug delivery ==
Concerns about aviation drug delivery started as early as 1924 when orthostatic stress was found to be the reason for a pilot's inability to digest chocolate during a flight. In addition, studies on the effect of digitalis on altitude were performed on both pigeons and cats in 1924, concluding that increased altitudes significantly increase the effects of digitalis on their systems, leading to a recommendation to decrease the dosage of digitalis in high altitudes to be two-fifths of the current dose.

As outer space expeditions grew in the mid-twentieth century, missions established medical practices to deliver medicines for astronauts in missions. Project Apollo in the late 1960s to early 1970s began the use of using medicine bags, which came with commonly used drugs for motion sickness and pain relief in oral form (tablets and capsules) as well as a nasal spray. The Mercury Project was one of the first space expeditions to take medicine delivery to outer space. Injector systems were first developed and used then to deliver and inject drugs directly into an individual's spacesuit into their thighs. These injection tubes were used to deliver Tigan and Demerol, respectively, motion sickness and pain relief drugs. Studies in the 1980s examined common orally-delivered drug functionalities in altered space environments, beginning with acetaminophen, concluding that they were less effective in outer space.

== Environmental conditions that impact pharmacological dynamics of drugs ==
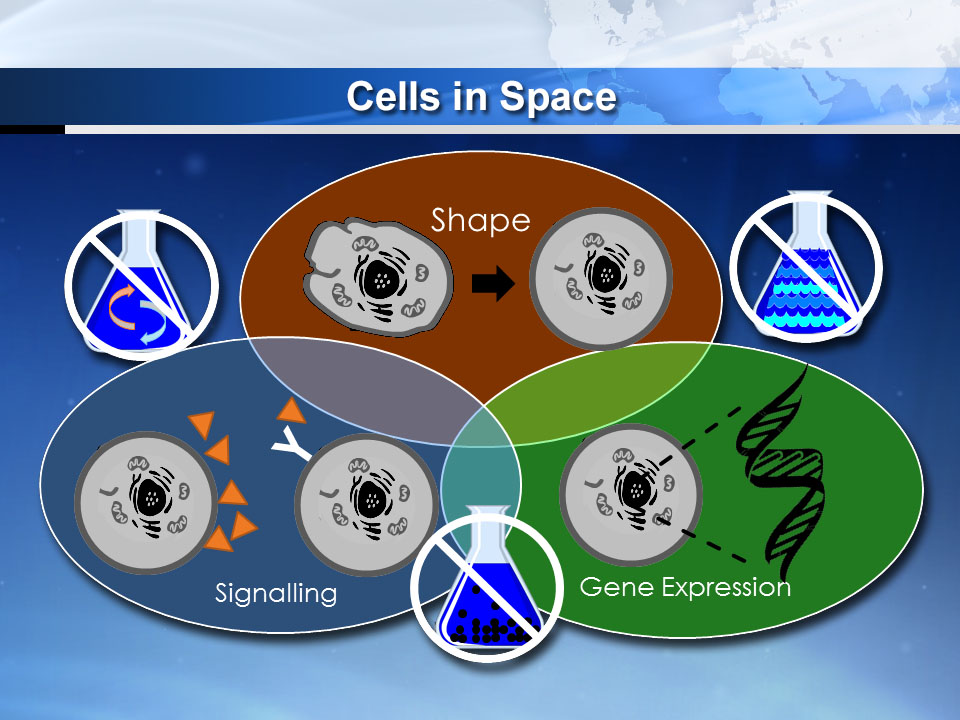
Several conditions of cells can change due to the effects of short-term and long-term spaceflight.

Several studies in the past have relied on the assumption that a drug's action would not be compromised when a subject and/or drug are placed in altered environments. However, the effect of outer space on the subject has been a recent concern on drug delivery and mechanism. There is a need to modify drug doses and release profiles to achieve maximum drug efficacy in outer space due to environmental implications on the human body. There are several conditions that NASA has identified that impact human physiology, affecting the pharmacological capabilities of drugs: Space Radiation, Isolation and Confinement, Distance from Earth, Gravity fields, and Hostile/Closed Environments (RIDGE), affecting drug absorption, distribution, metabolism, and excretion.

=== Radiation ===
Radiation exposure is increased in astronauts primarily due to low dose-rate galactic cosmic rays and intermittent solar particle events. This increased radiation exposure can cause epigenetic changes, including DNA double-stranded breaks, altered methylation patterns, and telomere lengths, increasing the risk of developing carcinogenesis, degenerative diseases, and central nervous system effects. In addition, radiation can impact drug synthesis, such as the development of toxic by-products, drug stability ... etc. The most common type of radiation found in outer space is called direct ionization, which can strike target molecules and can cause the rupture of chemical bonds and destroy polymer structures, while indirect ionization is when radiation hits water instead of a target, generating radiolitic products. that can diffuse and damage a target molecule within range. Because of this, liquid drug formulations are more unstable than solid drugs due to oxygen radical species forming in liquid conditions. Current solutions investigate using adequate packaging, storing excipients and drugs separately and in their solid or powdered form, or storing them at cryogenic temperatures.

=== Microgravity ===
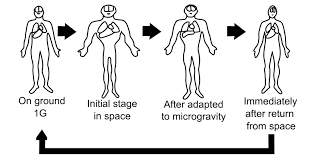
The effects of microgravity can be seen in the human body, beginning with a shift upwards in fluid, called the cephalad fluid shift. This can also cause other muscle and bodily disorientation as well.

Microgravity is the condition of low gravity found in outer space. Some of the major physiological implications that are associated with microgravity are bone loss, immunosuppression, enlargement of bones, muscle loss and movement of body fluids towards the head, spaceflight osteopenia, decrease in the function of cardiovascular system functions, decreased production of red blood cells, balance disorders, and also weaken the human immune system. In addition to this, fluid distribution is increased in the upper body due to the body's ability to pump blood faster to the upper body in microgravity conditions, known as the cephalad fluid shift. In addition, muscle regeneration protein levels have been estimated to vary due to microgravity conditions, including myostatin, activin A, and certain cytokines (e.g. IL-6, IL-10, IL-1ra), which are currently used as targets for drug delivery applications. The effects of microgravity has also investigated in wound healing processes, especially with the behavior of cell populations, such as fibroblasts. For cell studies, a Rotary Cell Culture System was used to mimic cell conditions in microgravity, where the bioreactor rotates horizontally, causing cell sedimentation in the vessel to be offset by the rotating fluid. This results in this light falling of cells, simulated in a microgravity environment. Studies showed a rearrangement of microtubules in cells due to microgravity, forming a dense, puzzled, network, unlike fibroblasts in a normal environment, which exhibit radial parallel formations. Several proteins in the wound repair process that are expressed by fibroblast activation, such as SMA, VEGF, and E-CAD proteins, were repressed or significantly decreased. However, pro-inflammatory signals, such as COX-2, were shown to increase by 87%. Another physiological factor affected by microgravity are membrane pores in cells. It was studied that under hypergravity, porins are increased while they are decreased in microgravity environments, which can impact drug metabolism and intake. Drug studies have shown potential advantages with microgravity conditions, such as less particle sedimentation or coalescence, however, microgravity conditions prevent the removal of air bubbles in injectable drug formulations, posing challenges for liquid drug infusions. In addition, best-rest models are used on Earth to study the pharmacodynamics of drugs in microgravity conditions.

=== Other conditions ===
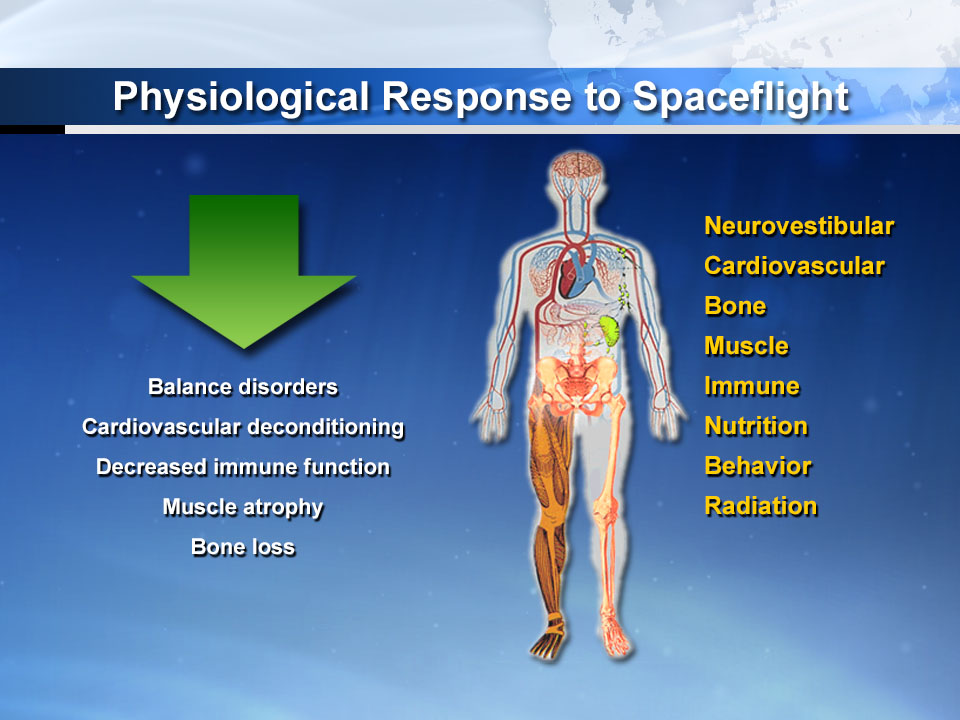
A list of possible physiological changes that can occur due to spaceflight. This can also affect how drugs react to the body.

One condition that can affect the pharmacological properties of drugs is protein degradation caused by spaceflight, predicted to be associated with adaptive downsizing of the antigravity muscles and the energy deficit. This is seen in other responses, such as fight-or-flight, the presence of a new pathogen or virus, or some sort of injury to the body. Other conditions that affect the pharmacological capabilities of drugs are hypoxia, where drug antagonism is almost negligible in lower blood oxygen levels and physiologic enzyme conditions are limited in high oxygen tension conditions. In addition, diuretics cans shift the oxygen-hemoglobin curve, affecting drug performance.

== Drug testing, manufacturing, and drug delivery technologies for outer space ==
=== Drug testing ===
Several pharmacokinetic studies have been performed on stimulated weightlessness and increased radiation conditions on common drugs to analyze their effects on physiology.

==== Acetaminophen ====
One of the main types of drug studies conducted is using astronauts as test subjects and measuring drug dynamics before and after spacecraft flight. A study on acetaminophen pharmacokinetics was performed on ten astronauts, studying its concentration dynamics in saliva two months before spaceflight and during long-term spaceflight. Saliva samples were analyzed at intervals of 0.017, 0.33, 0.5, 0.75, 1, 2, 4, and 6 hours after acetaminophen intake by HPLC with UV spectrophotometric detection at 254 nm. The absorption of acetaminophen during spaceflight was delayed after tablet administration and the bioavailability of the encapsulated drug was found to be moderately decreased. Additionally, the half-life of encapsulated acetaminophen was prolonged during spaceflight.

==== Promethazine ====
Promethazine is one of the recommended drugs by NASA to treat space motion sickness and studies have been conducted to analyze their pharmacological responses in outer space. Studies on promethazine were performed exclusively on Earth, called earthbound models, stimulating microgravity and weightlessness through forty-eight hours of bed rest. The −6° head-down best rest model, where individuals are placed lying 6 degrees down to study weightlessness. This type of model simulates the shift in fluid from the bottom to the top of the body, as well as bone loss, found in astronauts in weightless environments. Using twelve volunteers, 50 mg of promethazine was delivered orally or intramuscularly to the deltoid muscle before and after forty-eight hours of bedrest. Blood was examined at intervals of 0.5, 1, 1.5, 2, 3, 4, 6, 8, 10, 12, 16, 24, 36, and 48 hours post-drug deliverance and promethazine levels were detected using plasma promethazine assays, which uses liquid chromatography to quantify promethazine kinetics. The study determined that higher concentrations of promethazine were found in the blood through oral delivery and bioavailability factors was impacted through weightlessness.

==== Ciprofloxacin ====
Due to the constraints and confined environments that astronauts are exposed to for long durations of time, they are at risk for higher rates of infection. Ciprofloxacin is a common drug used to treat infections, especially bacterial of nature, and is used to study antibiotics delivery in outer space due to its good bioavailability, infrequent dose intake, multiple-dose intake abilities (oral or intravenous), and stability. This study also employs a bed-rest model called the antiorthostatis bed rest (ABR) model, where subjects lie at a 12° angle downwards to simulate space flight weightlessness. Six individuals were employed to take one dose of 250 mg ciprofloxacin, once at weightlessness and once at normal conditions, separated between fifteen days. Blood was examined at intervals of 0, 0.25, 0.5, 0.75, 1, 1.5, 2, 3, 4, 8, and 12 hours and urine samples were also collected at 0, 3, 6, 8, and 12 hours after each dose. It was found that ciprofloxacin's penetration in the tissue was lower in microgravity conditions than normal, indicating tissue penetration to be an issue in outer space for ciprofloxacin. In addition, compared to doses stored at ground versus in space, there was visible discoloration in samples stored in outer space and the expiration period in outer space was much shorter than on the ground.

=== Drug manufacturing ===
Due to the environmental factors present in outer space, alternative manufacturing methods are explored to produce medicines for astronaut use. For example, measuring the weight and volume of medicine ingredients in microgravity conditions is difficult and requires zero-gravity mass measurement devices. Current manufacturing methods also rely heavily on large and heavy machining, which cannot fit on spacecraft due to constrained spaces. New manufacturing methods for medicines have been developed that can adapt to outer space's environmental constraints. Chemputing is a chemical-robot system that uses limited technology to synthesize raw materials for pharmaceuticals. This apparatus includes a reaction flask, a jacketed filtration setup, an automated liquid-liquid separation module, and a solvent evaporation module, allowing astronauts to develop compounds on demand, not requiring a large space and taking into account the constraints of spaceflight. Additive manufacturing has already been used on Earth in the personalized medicine field and there are methods sent to outer space for drug manufacturing and fabrication. Some forms of fabrication tested in outer space are fused deposition printing, which employs 3D printing methods to print using layer-by-layer filament extrusions, semi-solid and direct powder extrusion, effective for bioprinting applications and can be leveraged to process materials found in outer space (silica, magnesium silicate, and calcium phosphate), and photopolymerization, which uses light to print a resin in a layer-by-layer mechanism. These methods are not only used for drug manufacturing but also for biomaterials or medical devices that can load drugs. Finally, methods are used to conduct quality assurance, such as gas chromatography, mass spectrometry, infrared spectroscopy, nuclear magnetic resonance spectroscopy, and other such techniques to identify potential toxins in drug formulations. Advances in handheld, portable, and component miniaturization have developed spectroscopy methods to be more accessible for outer space applications. For example, Raman spectroscopy is a handheld device that can measure drug degradation and drug parameters and efficacy.

=== Medicine storage and usage by astronauts ===
Medication storage and on-site production have become crucial areas of research due to extensive periods away from Earth. Factors, such as shelf life and drug stability, on drug storage, are impacted due to the effects of radiation, long space flight durations, and microgravity. Current solutions aim at frequent missions to resupply and restock medicines and commonly used drugs, however, this is not possible for long-term spaceflight to Mars or other distant missions. In addition, due to the toll that spaceflight takes on the human body, medicine use by astronauts have been extensively studied. High rates of sleep medication are taken by astronauts to combat sleep deprivation, disturbances, and other sleep-related disorders caused by an increased presence of CO_{2} in the International Space Station. Medications for congestion and allergies, combined with headache-related medications, are also significantly used, primarily because of the cephalad fluid shifts caused by a transition to weightless environment.

=== Drug delivery technologies for outer space ===
The need for developing drug delivery mechanisms that can accurately control dose frequency, concentration, and amount, for extreme conditions has grown as astronauts take on more extreme space exploration missions. Regenerative therapies have also gained prominence in space medicine. Microgravity conditions lead to bone loss due to repressing osteoblast growth, contributing to traumatic fractures, injuries, and extensive wound generation, requiring surgical intervention. Using a concept called facilitated endogenous repair, scientists are developing scaffolds to deliver drugs or other agents to promote normal physiology at an injury site. In addition, tunable nanoparticles are also being investigated to maintain mechanical integrity when distributed to bone injuries for repair.
