= Tamarack R. Czarnik =

American medical researcher

- Born: Tamarack Robert Czarnik (circa 1960–1961); Wisconsin
- Education: Ohio State University College of Medicine; Wright State University
- Known for: space medical research Mars Society
- Scientific career
- Fields: space medicine, bioastronautics
- Workplaces: Mars Society, Wright State University (residency)
- Thesis: An analysis of three approaches to exercise countermeasures in long-duration spaceflight (2004)

Tamarack "Tam" R. Czarnik is an American medical researcher, notable for space advocacy and academic studies of human physiology in extreme environmental conditions. Czarnik was at the origin of the Mars Society Chapter foundation in Dayton, Ohio, and also served as the chapter's first Chair. From 2001 to 2011, Czarnik served in several missions as Medical Director for the Mars Society's FMARS and MDRS, simulated Mars habitats.

== Biography ==
Tam Czarnik is originally from Wisconsin. He graduated with honors from Ohio State University College of Medicine in medicine residency in Casper, WY. During his medical career as a family doctor, Czarnik was affiliated with many hospitals including Marbleton/Big Piney Clinic, Altru Hospital (Nelson County Health System) and more. Beginning in September 2009, he worked as a family practice physician in McVille, ND and other nearby locations until his retirement in 2019.

=== Aerospace medical research and the Mars Society ===
After completing his first residency, Czarnik pursued additional training in aerospace medicine at Wright State University. During his residency in Aerospace Medicine and Hypobaric Medicine, Czarnik's research mainly focused on studies of space exposure and the effect of spaceflight on the human body including ebullism, decompression, reactions to drugs, physical activity and medical treatment during spaceflight. In 2004, Czarnik published his thesis on muscle degeneration in long-duration human spaceflight.

His studies led him to participate in FMARS and MDRS missions where he served as the medical director and flight surgeon for several crew missions from 2001 to 2011.

== Research ==
Czarnik's research focuses on aerospace medicine and the physiological effects of spaceflight, particularly the medical challenges of long-duration human missions. His work has examined rapid decompression and ebullism, medication responses in microgravity, muscle loss, exercise countermeasures, and artificial gravity.

His 1999 paper, Artificial Gravity: Current Concerns and Design Considerations, examined physiological and design considerations for using artificial gravity during space missions. His research also addressed the potential effects of spaceflight on drug action, in work co-authored with Joan Vernikos and published in the Journal of Gravitational Physiology in 1999. His 2004 thesis at Wright State University analyzed three approaches to exercise countermeasures for long-duration spaceflight, focusing on the prevention of muscle degeneration.

Czarnik also investigated medical care for simulated Mars missions. In his 2003 article “Medical Research in the Mars Society,” published in the Journal of Pharmacy Practice, he reviewed physiological and psychological risks associated with human exploration of Mars and discussed preventive measures, medical interventions, and areas requiring further research. His other publications addressed medical emergencies in space and the integration of remote-access medical equipment into spacesuits.

== Selected works ==
- Czarnik, R. T., The Remote Access Medical Suit, Space Times, (November/December 2005)
- Czarnik, R. T.,Medical Emergencies in Space, Space Times, (March/April 2005)
- Czarnik, R. T., Medical Research in the Mars Society, Journal of Pharmacy Practice (April 1, 2003)
- Czarnik, R.T., Countermeasures to long-duration spaceflight (Parts I, II), Wright State University
- Czarnik, R.T., Aerospace medicine 101: Adaptations to spaceflight, Mars Society
- Czarnik, R.T., Artificial Gravity: Current Concerns and Design Considerations, Wright State University, (March 1999)
- Czarnik, R. T., Ebullism at 1 million feet: Surviving Rapid/Explosive Decompression, Wright State University, (1999).
- Czarnik, R. T., Vernikos, J., Physiological changes in spaceflight that may affect drug action, Journal of Gravitational Physiology (July 1999)

== See also ==
- Effect of spaceflight on the human body
- Mars analog habitat
- Medical treatment during spaceflight
