= Medical treatment during spaceflight =

It is inevitable that medical conditions of varying complexity, severity and emergency will occur during spaceflight missions with human participants. Different levels of care are required depending on the problem, available resources and time required to return to Earth.

All medical problems have the potential to affect the mission, but significant illnesses or trauma will result in a high probability of mission failure or loss of crew. As the distance that missions travel from Earth increases, more possible medical conditions and types of trauma will need to be evaluated. Return to Earth will be highly unlikely or very difficult depending on the distance traveled. Emergency health care will, and psychological support may, have to be self-administered and could possibly be completely autonomous. The most effective way to provide adequate support is to establish a thorough pre-flight health status assessment and develop a systematic approach to autonomous health care in space.

For NASA, specific provisions and requirements for medical services during space missions are outlined in NPD 8900.5B NASA Health and Medical Policy for Human Space Exploration, NPD 8900.1G Medical Operations Responsibilities in Support of Human Space Flight Programs and NASA-STD-3001 NASA Spaceflight Human Systems Standard - Volume 1, Crew Health.

== In flight ==
In-flight Medical events for U.S. Astronauts during the Space Shuttle Program (STS-1 through STS-89, April 1981 to January 1998)
Medical Event or System by ICD9* Category	Number	Percent of Total
Space adaptation syndrome	788	42.2
Nervous system and sense organs	318	17.0
Digestive system	163	8.7
Skin and subcutaneous tissue	151	8.1
Injuries or trauma	141	7.6
Musculoskeletal system and connective tissue	132	7.1
Respiratory system	83	4.4
Behavioral signs and symptoms	34	1.8
Infectious diseases	26	1.4
Genitourinary system	23	1.2
Circulatory system	6	0.3
Endocrine, nutritional, metabolic, and immunity disorders	2	0.1
*International Classification of Diseases, 9th Ed.

=== Non-emergencies ===
Most medical conditions that occur while in flight do not constitute a medical emergency and can be treated with medication, if available. Some documented non-emergency conditions that have occurred while in space include, Space Adaptation Sickness, motion sickness, headache, sleeplessness, back pain, trauma, burns, dermatological conditions, musculoskeletal conditions, respiratory illness and genitourinary problems.

The use of medication relating to sleep loss and circadian rhythmicity is widespread amongst astronauts. According to an observational study of 79 early U.S. shuttle missions, hypnotic drugs accounted for 45% of all medication dispensed to astronauts in space.

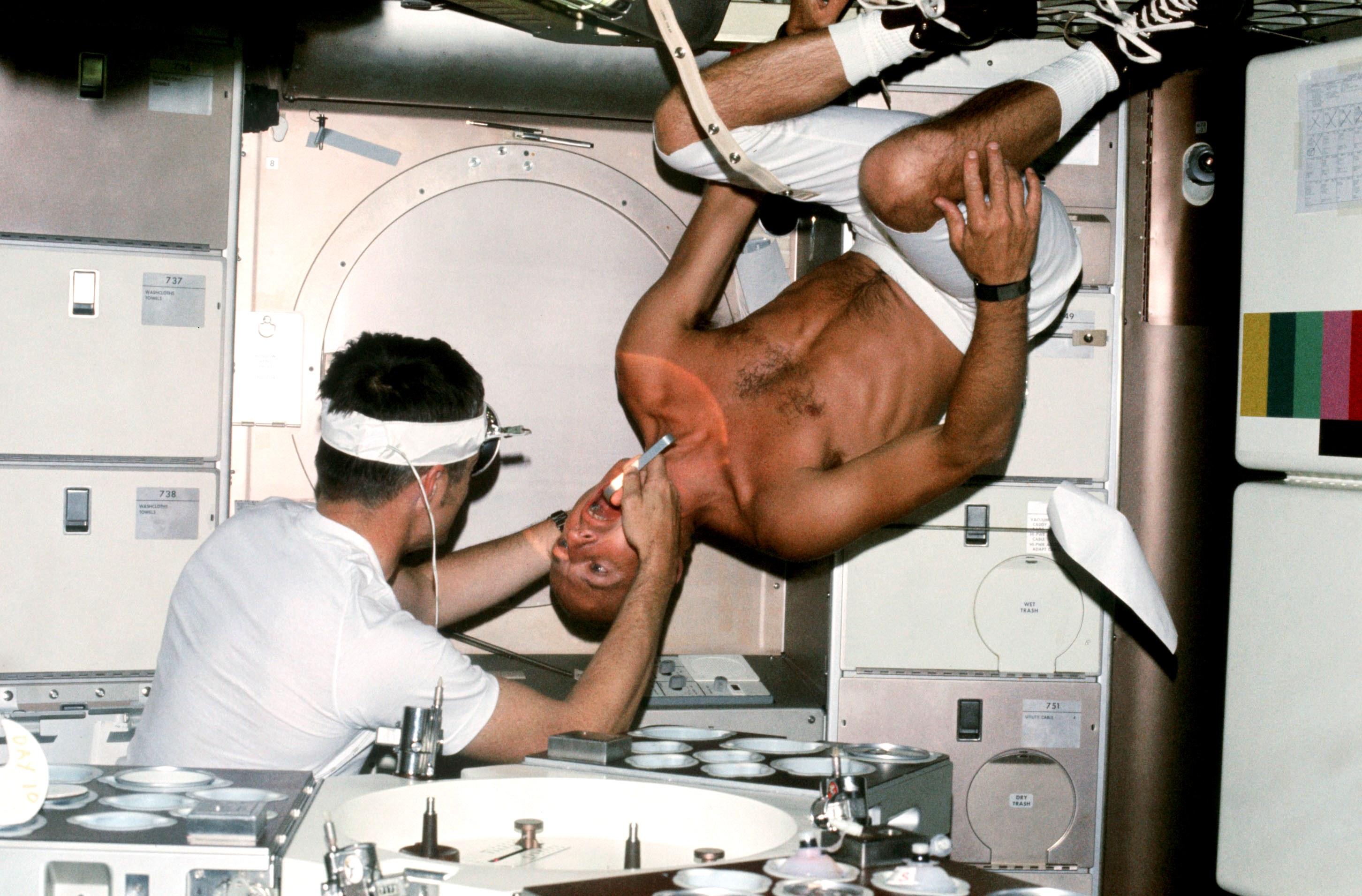
Skylab 2 Commander Charles Conrad is seen undergoing a dental examination by the Medical Officer, Joseph Kerwin in the Skylab Medical Facility.

=== Emergencies ===
Potential medical emergencies during space flight include arrhythmias, heart attack, stroke, embolism, massive hemorrhage, emergencies related to renal stone formation, infection and thrombotic complications.

To date, arrhythmias, renal colic, venous thrombosis, and infections have been documented during space flights. The documented arrhythmias were mostly mild abnormalities, but potentially serious arrhythmias have been reported.

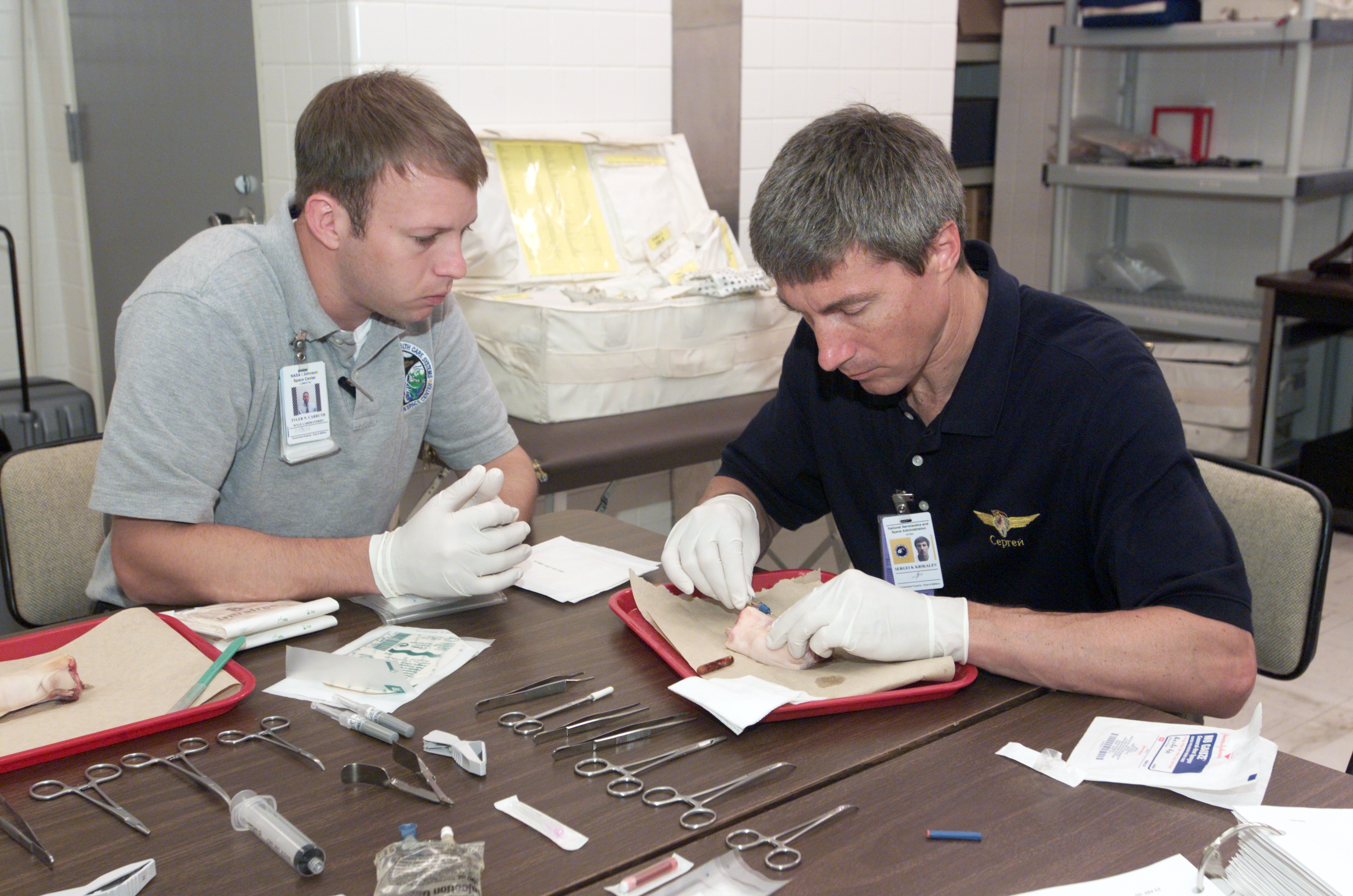
Cosmonaut Sergei K. Krikalev, Expedition 11 commander representing Russia's Federal Space Agency, participates in medical training at Johnson Space Center (JSC). Space Medicine Instructor Tyler N. Carruth with Wyle Life Sciences assisted Krikalev.

The manifestation of coronary artery disease has not been registered during any human space flight, but considering the risk of coronary events in older people and the increasing age of crew members, the possibility of complications during long-duration missions should not be ignored. Other medical emergencies that have been observed in space include rare but real cases of urological and dental emergencies.

Additional consideration substantiates the risk of the inability to treat crew members on long-duration missions.

Surgical treatment during long-duration spaceflight may be affected by the loss of gravity-dependent functions used in terrestrial operating rooms. Reduced gravity could alter abdominal exposure, blood and irrigation-fluid behaviour, surgeon stabilization, instrument restraint and biological containment. Although laparoscopic access has been demonstrated during brief periods of simulated microgravity, the feasibility of maintaining exposure during prolonged procedures remains uncertain.

=== Radiation ===
Radiation exposure may affect the general health of crew members and cause radiation specific pathological processes. Emergencies due to radiation exposure would most likely be catastrophic and mission ending.

=== Other risks ===
Other considerations for designing space medical care systems include exposure to toxic substances, chemical burns, electrical burns and trauma (on board and during EVA's). Exposure to a range of hazards including chemical substances, microbes, radiation and noise can be prevented or controlled by the application of effective astronautical hygiene practice.

A 2006 Space Shuttle experiment found that Salmonella typhimurium, a bacterium that can cause food poisoning, became more virulent when cultivated in space. On April 29, 2013, scientists in Rensselaer Polytechnic Institute, funded by NASA, reported that, during spaceflight on the International Space Station, microbes seem to adapt to the space environment in ways "not observed on Earth" and in ways that "can lead to increases in growth and virulence". More recently, in 2017, bacteria were found to be more resistant to antibiotics and to thrive in the near-weightlessness of space. Microorganisms have been observed to survive the vacuum of outer space.

== On the ground ==
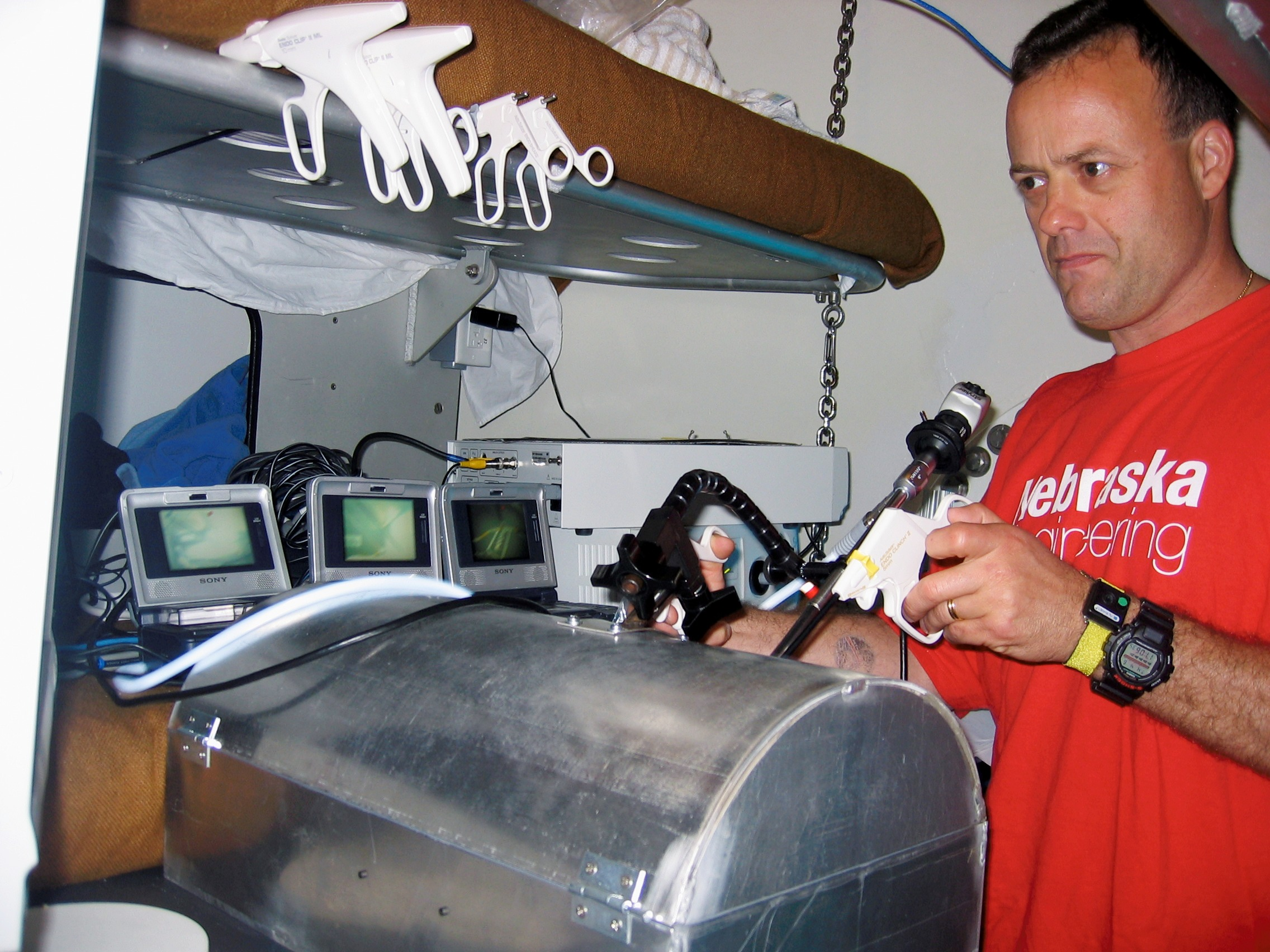
NEEMO-9 astronaut/aquanaut Ronald J. Garan Jr. works with a Center for Minimal Access Surgery (CMAS) experiment in the National Oceanic and Atmospheric Administration's (NOAA) Aquarius Underwater Laboratory, located off the coast of Key Largo, Florida, for the NASA Extreme Environment Mission Operations (NEEMO) project.

Ground-based incidences of illness encountered by individuals exposed to harsh environments (Antarctic expeditions, submarines and undersea habitats) could be considered as analogs of the space environment. These crews living and working in harsh environments have had medical emergencies such as intracerebral hemorrhage, stroke, myocardial infarction (heart attack), appendicitis and bone fractures. Cases of cancer and psychiatric illness were also documented.

Dental problems were the most common emergency during submarine and Antarctic expeditions and were a cause for transfer in the U.S. Polaris submarine program.

Risk estimates made from data provided by analog studies have certain limitations for long duration missions. Unique problems that are inherent to the space environment include the effects of radiation, exposure and physiological adaptation to low gravity. Cardiovascular events are of particular interest for long duration space missions and other harsh environments. To use United States Air Force (USAF) aviators as an example, even though they undergo a very rigorous health screening, the first manifestation of CAD (coronary artery disease) is a cardiac event. Even though the health assessment for an astronaut is more extensive than USAF aviators, data collected from USAF aviators are applicable to the astronaut corps and emphasizes the risk of occurrence of sudden death or heart attack in space despite thorough screening.

Appendicitis is the most common general surgical condition for the submarine program and has been the cause of one death on an Antarctic expedition. Other serious conditions reported in the submarine program and Antarctic expeditions include traumatic amputations, fractures, dislocations, depression and anxiety.

== Exploration scenarios ==
These documented conditions serve as a basis for the Exploration medical list. This list is currently under development and will assist in planning research and development activities. A medical support system is being developed to ensure that adequate medical care can be administered autonomously or with support from ground crews on Earth.

== Computer based simulators ==
The Integrated Medical Model (IMM), a computer based simulator that quantifies the probability and consequences of medical risks, is currently being developed.

== See also ==
- Astronautical hygiene
- Bioastronautics
- Effect of spaceflight on the human body
- Human analog missions
- Illness and injuries during spaceflight
- Space adaptation syndrome
- Space colonization
- Space exposure
- Space medicine § Ultrasound microgravity
- Space survival
