= Czarnik =

Czarnik is a Polish surname It is derived from a nickname: either from czarnik, which means 'black horse' or as a noun from the adjective czarny, 'black'. Notable people with the surname include:

- Anthony Czarnik, an American scientist and inventor
- Austin Czarnik (born 1992), American professional ice hockey player
- Marcin Czarnik (born 1976), Polish film and theatre actor
- Tamarack R. Czarnik, a medical researcher focused on outer space
