= Space medicine =

Application of medicine during spaceflight

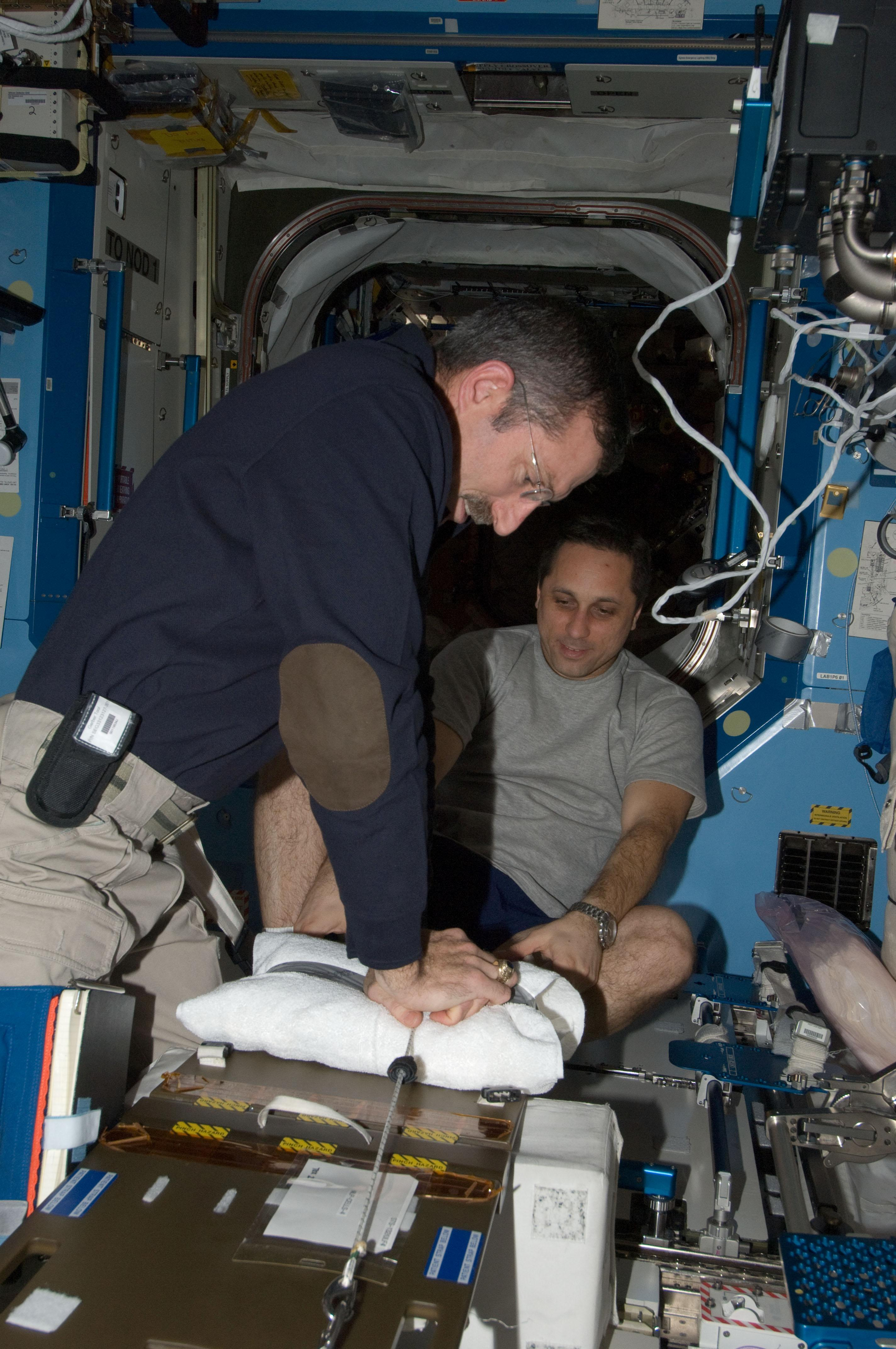
Dan Burbank and Anton Shkaplerov participate in a medical contingency drill in the Destiny laboratory of the International Space Station. This drill gives crew members the opportunity to work as a team in resolving a simulated medical emergency on board the space station.

Space medicine is the application of medicine under conditions experienced during spaceflight. It is developed from the aviation medicine specialty, and is a subspecialty of emergency medicine. Space medicine is dedicated to the prevention and treatment of medical conditions that would limit success in space operations. Space medicine focuses specifically on prevention, acute care, emergency medicine, wilderness medicine, hyper/hypobaric medicine in order to provide medical care of astronauts and spaceflight participants.

The spaceflight environment poses many unique stressors to the human body, including g-force, microgravity, unusual atmospheres such as low pressure or high carbon dioxide, and space radiation. These challenges are addressed by studying the physiological effects in space, and the application of preventive medicine, primary care, emergency medicine, acute care medicine, austere medicine, physical fitness, nutrition, public health, behavioral health, systems medicine, and toxicology, in order to inform vehicle design, mission plans, and prevent and treat medical problems in space. This expertise is additionally used to inform vehicle systems design to minimize the risk to human health and performance while meeting mission objectives.

Astronautical hygiene is the application of science and technology to the prevention or control of exposure to the hazards that may cause astronaut ill health. Both these sciences work together to ensure that astronauts work in a safe environment. Medical consequences such as possible visual impairment and bone loss have been associated with human spaceflight.

In October 2015, the NASA Office of Inspector General issued a health hazards report related to space exploration, including a human mission to Mars.

== History ==
Hubertus Strughold (1898–1987), a former Nazi physician and physiologist, was brought to the United States after World War II as part of Operation Paperclip. He first coined the term "space medicine" in 1948 and was the first and only Professor of Space Medicine at the School of Aviation Medicine (SAM) at Randolph Air Force Base, Texas. In 1949, Strughold was made director of the Department of Space Medicine at the SAM (which is now the US Air Force School of Aerospace Medicine (USAFSAM) at Wright-Patterson Air Force Base, Ohio. He played an important role in developing the pressure suit worn by early American astronauts. He was a co-founder of the Space Medicine Branch of the Aerospace Medical Association in 1950. The aeromedical library at Brooks AFB was named after him in 1977, but later renamed because documents from the Nuremberg War Crimes Tribunal linked Strughold to medical experiments in which inmates of the Dachau concentration camp were tortured and killed.

Soviet research into Space Medicine was centered at the Scientific Research Testing Institute of Aviation Medicine (NIIAM). In 1949, A.M. Vasilevsky, the Minister of Defense of the USSR, gave instructions via the initiative of Sergei Korolev to NIIAM to conduct biological and medical research. In 1951, NIIAM began to work on the first research work entitled "Physiological and hygienic substantiation of flight capabilities in special conditions", which formulated the main research tasks, the necessary requirements for pressurized cabins, life support systems, rescue and control and recording equipment. At the Korolev design bureau, they created rockets for lifting animals within 200–250 km and 500–600 km, and then began to talk about developing artificial satellites and launching a man into space. Then in 1963 the Institute for Biomedical Problems (IMBP) was founded to undertake the study of space medicine.

=== Animal testing ===
Extensive animal testing were conducted to study the effects of space travel on the body before any humans were sent into space. In 1951, a monkey and a group of mice aboard an Aerobee rocket became the first animals to return alive after flying at near space altitudes; and on November 3, 1957, Laika, a Soviet space dog, became the first living animal to orbit the Earth, when she flew aboard the Sputnik 2 spacecraft, before succumbing to hyperthermia during the fourth orbit. This flight and others suggested the possibility of safely flying in space within a controlled environment, and provided data on how living beings react to space flight. Later flights with cameras to observe the animal subjects would show in flight conditions such as high-G and zero-G. Russian tests yielded more valuable physiological data from the animal tests.

On January 31, 1961, a chimpanzee named Ham was launched into a sub-orbital flight aboard a Mercury-Redstone Launch Vehicle. The flight was meant to model the planned mission of astronaut Alan Shepard. The mission planned to reach an altitude of 115 miles^{185 km}, and speeds up to 4400 miles^{7,100 km} per hour. However, the actual flight reached 157 miles^{253 km} and a maximum speed of 5857 miles^{9,426 km} per hour. During flight, Ham experienced 6.6 minutes of weightlessness. After splashing down in the Atlantic Ocean, Ham was recovered by the USS Donner. He suffered only limited injuries during flight, only receiving a bruised nose. Ham's vital signs were monitored and collected throughout the 16-minute flight, and used to develop life support systems for later human astronauts.

Animal testing in space continues currently, with mice, ants, and other animals regularly being sent to the International Space Station. In 2014, eight ant colonies were sent to the ISS to investigate the group behavior of ants in microgravity. The ISS allows for the investigation of animal behavior without sending them in specifically designed capsules.

=== North American X-15 ===
Rocket-powered aircraft North American X-15 provided an early opportunity to study the effects of a near-space environment on human physiology. At its highest operational speed and altitude, the X-15 provided approximately five minutes of weightlessness. This opportunity allowed for the development of devices to facilitate working in low pressure, high acceleration environments such as pressure suits, and telemetering systems to collect physiological data. This data and technologies allowed for better mission planning for future space missions.

=== Project Mercury ===
Space medicine was a critical factor in the United States human space program, starting with Project Mercury. The main precaution taken by Mercury astronauts to defend against high G environments like launch and reentry was a couch with seat belts to make sure astronauts were not forcibly moved from their position. Additionally, experienced pilots proved to be better able to cope with high G scenarios. One of the pressing concerns with Project Mercury's mission environment was the isolated nature of the cabin. There were deeper concerns about psychological issues than there were about physiological health effects. Substantial animal testing proved beyond a reasonable doubt to NASA engineers that spaceflight could be done safely provided a climate controlled environment.

=== Project Gemini ===
The Gemini program primarily addressed the psychological issues from isolation in space with two crewmembers. Upon returning from space, it was recorded that crewmembers experienced a loss of balance and a decrease in anaerobic ability.

=== Project Apollo ===
The Apollo program began with a substantial basis of medical knowledge and precautions from both Mercury and Gemini. The understanding of high and low G environments was well documented and the effects of isolation had been addressed with Gemini and Apollo having multiple occupants in one capsule. The primary research of the Apollo Program focused on pre-flight and post-flight monitoring. Some Apollo mission plans were postponed or altered due to some or all crewmembers contracting a communicable disease. Apollo 14 instituted a form of quarantine for crewmembers so as to curb the passing of typical illnesses. While the efficacy of the Flight Crew Health Stabilization Program was questionable as some crewmembers still contracted diseases, the program showed enough results to maintain implementation with current space programs.

== Effects of space-travel ==
The effects of microgravity on fluid distribution around the body (greatly exaggerated) (NASA)

In October 2018, NASA-funded researchers found that lengthy journeys into outer space, including travel to the planet Mars, may substantially damage the gastrointestinal tissues of astronauts. The studies support earlier work that found such journeys could significantly damage the brains of astronauts, and age them prematurely.

In November 2019, researchers reported that astronauts experienced serious blood flow and clot problems while on board the International Space Station, based on a six-month study of 11 healthy astronauts. The results may influence long-term spaceflight, including a mission to the planet Mars, according to the researchers.

=== Blood clots ===
Deep vein thrombosis of the internal jugular vein of the neck was first discovered in 2020 in an astronaut on a long duration stay on the ISS, requiring treatment with blood thinners. A subsequent study of eleven astronauts found slowed blood flow in the neck veins and even reversal of blood flow in two of the astronauts. NASA is currently conducting more research to study whether these abnormalities could predispose astronauts to blood clots.

=== Cardiac rhythms ===
Heart rhythm disturbances have been seen among astronauts. Most of these have been related to cardiovascular disease, but it is not clear whether this was due to pre-existing conditions or effects of space flight. It is hoped that advanced screening for coronary disease has greatly mitigated this risk. Other heart rhythm problems, such as atrial fibrillation, can develop over time, necessitating periodic screening of crewmembers' heart rhythms. Beyond these terrestrial heart risks, some concern exists that prolonged exposure to microgravity may lead to heart rhythm disturbances. Although this has not been observed to date, further surveillance is warranted.

=== Decompression illness in spaceflight ===
In space, astronauts use a space suit, essentially a self-contained individual spacecraft, to do spacewalks, or extra-vehicular activities (EVAs). Spacesuits are generally inflated with 100% oxygen at a total pressure that is less than a third of normal atmospheric pressure. Eliminating inert atmospheric components such as nitrogen allows the astronaut to breathe comfortably, but also have the mobility to use their hands, arms, and legs to complete required work, which would be more difficult in a higher pressure suit.

After the astronaut dons the spacesuit, air is replaced by 100% oxygen in a process called a "nitrogen purge". In order to reduce the risk of decompression sickness, the astronaut must spend several hours "pre-breathing" at an intermediate nitrogen partial pressure, in order to let their body tissues outgas nitrogen slowly enough that bubbles are not formed. When the astronaut returns to the "shirt sleeve" environment of the spacecraft after an EVA, pressure is restored to whatever the operating pressure of that spacecraft may be, generally normal atmospheric pressure. Decompression illness in spaceflight consists of decompression sickness (DCS) and other injuries due to uncompensated changes in pressure, or barotrauma.

==== Decompression sickness ====
Decompression sickness is the injury to the tissues of the body resulting from the presence of nitrogen bubbles in the tissues and blood. This occurs due to a rapid reduction in ambient pressure causing the dissolved nitrogen to come out of solution as gas bubbles within the body. In space the risk of DCS is significantly reduced by using a technique to wash out the nitrogen in the body's tissues. This is achieved by breathing 100% oxygen for a specified period of time before donning the spacesuit, and is continued after a nitrogen purge. DCS may result from inadequate or interrupted pre-oxygenation time, or other factors including the astronaut's level of hydration, physical conditioning, prior injuries and age. Other risks of DCS include inadequate nitrogen purge in the EMU, a strenuous or excessively prolonged EVA, or a loss of suit pressure. Non-EVA crewmembers may also be at risk for DCS if there is a loss of spacecraft cabin pressure.

Symptoms of DCS in space may include chest pain, shortness of breath, cough or pain with a deep breath, unusual fatigue, lightheadedness, dizziness, headache, unexplained musculoskeletal pain, tingling or numbness, extremities weakness, or visual abnormalities.

Primary treatment principles consist of in-suit repressurization to re-dissolve nitrogen bubbles, 100% oxygen to re-oxygenate tissues, and hydration to improve the circulation to injured tissues.

==== Barotrauma ====
Barotrauma is the injury to the tissues of air filled spaces in the body as a result of differences in pressure between the body spaces and the ambient atmospheric pressure. Air filled spaces include the middle ears, paranasal sinuses, lungs and gastrointestinal tract. One would be predisposed by a pre-existing upper respiratory infection, nasal allergies, recurrent changing pressures, dehydration, or a poor equalizing technique.

Positive pressure in the air filled spaces results from reduced barometric pressure during the depressurization phase of an EVA. It can cause abdominal distension, ear or sinus pain, decreased hearing, and dental or jaw pain. Abdominal distension can be treated with extending the abdomen, gentle massage and encourage passing flatus. Ear and sinus pressure can be relieved with passive release of positive pressure. Pretreatment for susceptible individuals can include oral and nasal decongestants, or oral and nasal steroids.

Negative pressure in air fill spaces results from increased barometric pressure during repressurization after an EVA or following a planned restoration of a reduced cabin pressure. Common symptoms include ear or sinus pain, decreased hearing, and tooth or jaw pain.

Treatment may include active positive pressure equalization of ears and sinuses, oral and nasal decongestants, or oral and nasal steroids, and appropriate pain medication if needed.

=== Decreased immune system functioning ===
Astronauts in space have weakened immune systems, which means that in addition to increased vulnerability to new exposures, viruses already present in the body—which would normally be suppressed—become active. In space, T-cells do not reproduce properly, and the cells that do exist are less able to fight off infection. NASA research is measuring the change in the immune systems of its astronauts as well as performing experiments with T-cells in space.

On April 29, 2013, scientists in Rensselaer Polytechnic Institute, funded by NASA, reported that, during spaceflight on the International Space Station, microbes seem to adapt to the space environment in ways "not observed on Earth" and in ways that "can lead to increases in growth and virulence".

In March 2019, NASA reported that latent viruses in humans may be activated during space missions, adding possibly more risk to astronauts in future deep-space missions.

=== Increased infection risk ===
A 2006 Space Shuttle experiment found that Salmonella typhimurium, a bacterium that can cause food poisoning, became more virulent when cultivated in space. On April 29, 2013, scientists in Rensselaer Polytechnic Institute, funded by NASA, reported that, during spaceflight on the International Space Station (ISS), microbes seem to adapt to the space environment in ways "not observed on Earth" and in ways that "can lead to increases in growth and virulence". More recently, in 2017, bacteria were found to be more resistant to antibiotics and to thrive in the near-weightlessness of space. Microorganisms have been observed to survive the vacuum of outer space. Researchers in 2018 reported, after detecting the presence on the ISS of five Enterobacter bugandensis bacterial strains, none pathogenic to humans, that microorganisms on ISS should be carefully monitored to continue assuring a medically healthy environment for astronauts.

=== Effects of fatigue ===
Human spaceflight often requires astronaut crews to endure long periods without rest. Studies have shown that lack of sleep can cause fatigue that leads to errors while performing critical tasks. Also, individuals who are fatigued often cannot determine the degree of their impairment. Astronauts and ground crews frequently suffer from the effects of sleep deprivation and circadian rhythm disruption. Fatigue due to sleep loss, sleep shifting and work overload could cause performance errors that put space flight participants at risk of compromising mission objectives as well as the health and safety of those on board.

=== Loss of balance ===
Leaving and returning to Earth's gravity causes "space sickness", dizziness, and loss of balance in astronauts. By studying how changes can affect balance in the human body—involving the senses, the brain, the inner ear, and blood pressure—NASA hopes to develop treatments that can be used on Earth and in space to correct balance disorders. Until then, NASA's astronauts must rely on a medication called Midodrine (an "anti-dizzy" pill that temporarily increases blood pressure), and/or promethazine to help carry out the tasks they need to do to return home safely.

=== Loss of bone density ===
Spaceflight osteopenia is the bone loss associated with human spaceflight. The metabolism of calcium is limited in microgravity and will cause calcium to leak out of bones. After a 3–4 month trip into space, it takes about 2–3 years to regain lost bone density. New techniques are being developed to help astronauts recover faster. Research in the following areas holds the potential to aid the process of growing new bone:

- Diet and exercise changes may reduce osteoporosis.
- Vibration Therapy may stimulate bone growth.
- Medication could trigger the body to produce more of the protein responsible for bone growth and formation.

=== Loss of muscle mass ===
In space, muscles in the legs, back, spine, and heart weaken and waste away because they no longer are needed to overcome gravity, just as people lose muscle when they age due to reduced physical activity. Astronauts rely on research in the following areas to build muscle and maintain body mass:

- Exercise may build muscle if at least two hours a day is spent doing resistance training routines.
- Neuromuscular Electrical Stimulation as a method to prevent muscle atrophy.

=== Impairment of eyesight ===
During long space flight missions, astronauts may develop ocular changes and visual impairment collectively known as the Space Associated Neuro-ocular Syndrome (SANS). Such vision problems may be a major concern for future deep space flight missions, including a human mission to Mars.

=== Loss of mental abilities and risk of Alzheimer's disease ===
On December 31, 2012, a NASA-supported study reported that human spaceflight may harm the brain of astronauts and accelerate the onset of Alzheimer's disease.

On November 2, 2017, scientists reported that significant changes in the position and structure of the brain have been found in astronauts who have taken trips in space, based on MRI studies. Astronauts who took longer space trips were associated with greater brain changes.

=== Orthostatic intolerance ===
The Beckman cardiovascular reflex conditioning system inflated and deflated cuffs in Gemini and Apollo flight suits to stimulate blood flow to lower limbs.

Under the influence of the earth's gravity, blood and other body fluids are pulled towards the lower body when standing. When gravity is removed during space exploration, hydrostatic pressures throughout the body are removed and the resulting change in blood distribution may be similar lying down on Earth where hydrostatic differences are minimized. Upon return to earth, reduced blood volume from spaceflight results in orthostatic hypotension. Orthostatic tolerance after spaceflight has been greatly improved by fluid loading countermeasures taken by astronauts before landing.

=== Radiation effects ===
Comparison of Radiation Doses – includes the amount detected on the trip from Earth to Mars by the RAD on the MSL (2011–2013).

Soviet cosmonaut Valentin Lebedev, who spent 211 days in orbit during 1982 (an absolute record for stay in Earth's orbit), lost his eyesight to progressive cataract. Lebedev stated: "I suffered from a lot of radiation in space. It was all concealed back then, during the Soviet years, but now I can say that I caused damage to my health because of that flight." On May 31, 2013, NASA scientists reported that a possible human mission to Mars may involve a great radiation risk based on the amount of energetic particle radiation detected by the RAD on the Mars Science Laboratory while traveling from the Earth to Mars in 2011–2012.

=== Loss of kidney function ===
On June 11, 2024, researchers at the University College of London's Department of Renal Medicine reported that "Serious health risks emerge (with respect to the kidneys) the longer a person is exposed to Galactic Radiation and microgravity." Based on their current research with mice, the researchers predicted that astronauts who have been exposed to micro-gravity, reduced gravity, and Galactic radiation for 3 years or so on a Mars mission may have to return to Earth while attached to dialysis machines.

=== Sleep disorders ===
Spaceflight has been observed to disrupt physiological processes that influence sleep patterns in human beings. Astronauts exhibit asynchronized cortisol rhythmicity, dampened diurnal fluctuations in body temperature, and diminished sleep quality. Sleep pattern disruption in astronauts is a form of extrinsic (environmentally caused) circadian rhythm sleep disorder.

== Spaceflight analogues ==
Biomedical research in space is expensive and logistically and technically complicated, and thus limited. Conducting medical research in space alone will not provide humans with the depth of knowledge needed to ensure the safety of inter-planetary travelers. Complementary to research in space is the use of spaceflight analogues. Analogues are particularly useful for the study of immunity, sleep, psychological factors, human performance, habitability, and telemedicine. Examples of spaceflight analogues include confinement chambers (Mars-500), sub-aqua habitats (NEEMO), and Antarctic (Concordia Station) and Arctic FMARS and (Haughton–Mars Project) stations.

== Space medicine careers ==
Physicians in space medicine generally work in operations or research at NASA or, more recently, space companies that are flying private or commercial astronauts or spaceflight participants.

Research physicians study specific space medical problems, such as the Space Associated Neuro-ocular Syndrome, or focus on medical capabilities for future deep space exploration missions. Research physicians do not have clinical responsibilities in the care of astronauts and thereby are often not specialty-trained in Space Medicine.

=== Related degrees, areas of specialization, and certifications ===
There are currently only three fellowships in Space Medicine: University of Texas at Houston, UCLA, and Harvard.

All of the above training programs should include training in the following areas:

- Acute Care Medicine
- Commercial Spaceflight Training
- Flight Medicine
- Interventional Radiology Procedures
- Human Life Support Systems for Space
- Emergency Medicine
- Aerospace studies
- Global Health
- Hyperbaric and Hypobaric Medicine
- Public Health
- Disaster medicine
- Prehospital medicine
- Wilderness and extreme medicine

=== Space nursing ===
Space nursing is the nursing specialty that studies how space travel impacts human response patterns. Similar to space medicine, the specialty also contributes to knowledge about nursing care of earthbound patients.

== Medicine in flight ==
=== Sleep medicine ===
The use of hypnotic sleep aids is widespread among astronauts, with one 10-year-long study finding that 75% and 78% of ISS and space shuttle crew members reported taking such medications while in space. Of astronauts who took hypnotic medications, frequency of use was 52% of all nights. NASA allocates 8.5 hours of 'downtime' for sleep per day for astronauts aboard the ISS, but the average duration of sleep is only 6 hours. Poor sleep quality and quantity can compromise the daytime performance and attentiveness of space crew. As such, improving nighttime sleep has been a topic of NASA-funded research for more than half a century. The following pharmacological and environmental strategies have been investigated in the context of sleep in space:

- Light therapy involving exposure to visible light at varying intensities and wavelengths to entrain circadian rhythm, is key a topic of interest in NASA-funded research. Various photoreceptors in the human eye such as melanopsin, rhodopsin, and photopsin communicate with the suprachiasmatic nucleus (the master circadian pacemaker of the brain) to entrain circadian rhythm. Melanopsin photoreceptors are most sensitive to blue light wavelengths in the range of 470–490 nm (blue light). NASA has trialed and implemented rhythmic light panels on the ISS to assist entrain the circadian rhythms of astronauts. NASA is soon to test more advanced light panels that change their output light intensity and wavelengths according to time of day, with red-tinted lights (<600 nm) set to be used at night to provide visibility at 'night' and shorter wavelengths of high light intensity to be used in the 'morning' or at times where alertness and vigilance are needed.
- Melatonin, a naturally occurring hormone secreted by pineal gland, has shown positive effects in reducing sleep latency in orbit.
- Nonbenzodiazepines sedative-hypnotics (also known as "z drugs") such as Zolpidem, Zopiclone, and Zaleplon are the most commonly dispensed medications on the ISS. Despite their widespread use amongst astronauts, relatively little research has been conducted on nonbenzodiazepines in the context of spaceflight. Prior research suggests that nonbenzodiazepines may produce less residual impairment than most benzodiazepines. The shortest acting nonbenzodiazepine, Zaleplon, produces little to no cognitive impairment (at clinically relevant doses) even when dosed as little as an hour before awakening. Astronauts frequently take second doses of hypnotic drugs, the shorter duration of action of nonbenzodiazepines may be better suited to middle-of-the-night dosing
- Benzodiazepines are frequently used medications in space, though less often than nonbenzodiazepine "z-drugs". The longer acting nature of some benzodiazepines used by astronauts, such as temazepam, has been cited as "non-ideal" for spaceflight use due to a high tendency of causing morning impairments.
- Modafinil, a wakefulness drug, is available on the space station to mitigate the deleterious effects of sleep disruption and "optimise performance while fatigued". Modafinil has shown positive results in restoring cognitive function to baseline in the face of total sleep deprivation, though no studies examining modafinil's effects in astronauts have been conducted.

=== Ultrasound and space ===
Ultrasound is the main diagnostic imaging tool on ISS and for the foreseeable future missions. X-rays and CT scans involve radiation which is unacceptable in the space environment. Though MRI uses magnetics to create images, it is too large at present to consider as a viable option. Ultrasound, which uses sound waves to create images and comes in laptop size packages, provides imaging of a wide variety of tissues and organs. It is currently being used to look at the eyeball and the optic nerve to help determine the cause(s) of changes that NASA has noted mostly in long duration astronauts. NASA is also pushing the limits of ultrasound use regarding musculoskeletal problems as these are some of the most common and most likely problems to occur. Significant challenges to using ultrasounds on space missions is training the astronaut to use the equipment (ultrasound technicians spend years in training and developing the skills necessary to be "good" at their job) as well as interpreting the images that are captured. Much of ultrasound interpretation is done real-time but it is impractical to train astronauts to actually read/interpret ultrasounds. Thus, the data is currently being sent back to mission control and forwarded to medical personnel to read and interpret. Future exploration class missions will need to be autonomous due to transmission times taking too long for urgent/emergent medical conditions. The ability to be autonomous, or to use other equipment such as MRIs, is currently being researched.

=== Space Shuttle era ===
With the additional lifting capability presented by the Space Shuttle program, NASA designers were able to create a more comprehensive medical readiness kit. The SOMS consists of two separate packages: the Medications and Bandage Kit (MBK) and the Emergency Medical Kit (EMK). While the MBK contained capsulate medications (tablets, capsules, and suppositories), bandage materials, and topical medication, the EMK had medications to be administered by injection, items for performing minor surgeries, diagnostic/therapeutic items, and a microbiological test kit.

John Glenn, the first American astronaut to orbit the Earth, returned with much fanfare to space once again on STS-95 at 77 years of age to confront the physiological challenges preventing long-term space travel for astronauts—loss of bone density, loss of muscle mass, balance disorders, sleep disturbances, cardiovascular changes, and immune system depression—all of which are problems confronting aging people as well as astronauts.

=== Future investigations ===
==== Feasibility of Long Duration Space Flights ====
In the interest of creating the possibility of longer duration space flight, NASA has invested in the research and application of preventive space medicine, not only for medically preventable pathologies but trauma as well. Although trauma constitutes more of a life-threatening situation, medically preventable pathologies pose more of a threat to astronauts. "The involved crewmember is endangered because of mission stress and the lack of complete treatment capabilities on board the spacecraft, which could result in the manifestation of more severe symptoms than those usually associated with the same disease in the terrestrial environment. Also, the situation is potentially hazardous for the other crewmembers because the small, closed, ecological system of the spacecraft is conducive to disease transmission. Even if the disease is not transmitted, the safety of the other crewmembers may be jeopardized by the loss of the capabilities of the crewmember who is ill. Such an occurrence will be more serious and potentially hazardous as the durations of crewed missions increase and as operational procedures become more complex. Not only do the health and safety of the crewmembers become critical, but the probability of mission success is lessened if the illness occurs during flight. Aborting a mission to return an ill crewmember before mission goals are completed is costly and potentially dangerous." Treatment of trauma may involve surgery in zero-gravity, which is a challenging proposition given the need for blood sample containment. Diagnosis and monitoring of crew members is a particularly vital need. The development of surgical care for exploration missions also raises questions about the role of gravity in operative techniques. Gravity-assisted displacement of abdominal organs, drainage of blood and irrigation fluids, stabilization of surgeons and instruments, and containment of biological material are factors that may change in reduced-gravity environments. It has been questioned whether the advantages of minimally invasive surgery on Earth can be assumed to apply in space, noting that prolonged operative exposure has not been adequately tested. In 2022, NASA evaluated the rHEALTH ONE platform, a miniature cytometry-based biomedical analyzer, for onboard real-time biomedical monitoring in on-orbit and deep-space missions to the Moon and Mars, supporting future crewed exploration. This capability is mapped to Risk of Adverse Health Outcomes and Decrements in Performance Due to Medical Conditions that occur in Mission, as well as Long Term Health Outcomes Due to Mission Exposures. Without an approach to perform onboard medical monitoring, loss of crew members may jeopardize long duration missions.

== Impact on science and medicine ==
Astronauts are not the only ones who benefit from space medicine research. Several medical products have been developed that are space spinoffs, which are practical applications for the field of medicine arising out of the space program. Because of joint research efforts between NASA, the National Institutes on Aging (a part of the National Institutes of Health), and other aging-related organizations, space exploration has benefited a particular segment of society, seniors. Evidence of aging related medical research conducted in space was most publicly noticeable during STS-95. These spin-offs are sometimes termed as "exomedicine".

=== Pre-Mercury through Apollo ===
- Radiation therapy for the treatment of cancer: In conjunction with the Cleveland Clinic, the cyclotron at Glenn Research Center in Cleveland, Ohio was used in the first clinical trials for the treatment and evaluation of neutron therapy for cancer patients.
- Foldable walkers: Made from a lightweight metal material developed by NASA for aircraft and spacecraft, foldable walkers are portable and easy to manage.
- Personal alert systems: These are emergency alert devices that can be worn by individuals who may require emergency medical or safety assistance. When a button is pushed, the device sends a signal to a remote location for help. To send the signal, the device relies on telemetry technology developed at NASA.
- CAT and MRI scans: These devices are used by hospitals to see inside the human body. Their development would not have been possible without the technology provided by NASA after it found a way to take better pictures of the Earth's moon.
- Neuromuscular Electric Stimulation (NMES): A form of treatment originally developed to combat muscle atrophy in space that has been found to have applications outside of space. A prominent example of NMES being used outside of space medicine is muscle stimulator devices for paralyzed individuals. These devices can be used from up to half an hour per day to prevent muscle atrophy in paralyzed individuals. It provides electrical stimulation to muscles which is equal to jogging three miles per week. A well-known example is that Christopher Reeve used these in his therapy. Outside of paralyzed individuals, it also has applications in sports medicine, where it is used to manage or prevent potential damages that those high-intensity lifestyles have on athletes.
- Orthopedic evaluation tools: equipment to evaluate posture, gait and balance disturbances was developed at NASA, along with a radiation-free way to measure bone flexibility using vibration.
- Diabetic foot mapping: This technique was developed at NASA's center in Cleveland, Ohio to help monitor the effects of diabetes in feet.
- Foam cushioning: special foam used for cushioning astronauts during liftoff is used in pillows and mattresses at many nursing homes and hospitals to help prevent ulcers, relieve pressure, and provide a better night's sleep.
- Kidney dialysis machines: the Marquardt Corporation, an ancestor company with NASA, were developing a system that would purify and recycle water during space missions in the late 1960s. From this project, the Marquardt Corporation observed that these processes could be used in removing toxic waste from used dialysis fluid. This allowed the development of a kidney dialysis machine. These machines rely on technology developed by NASA in order to process and remove toxic waste from used dialysis fluid.

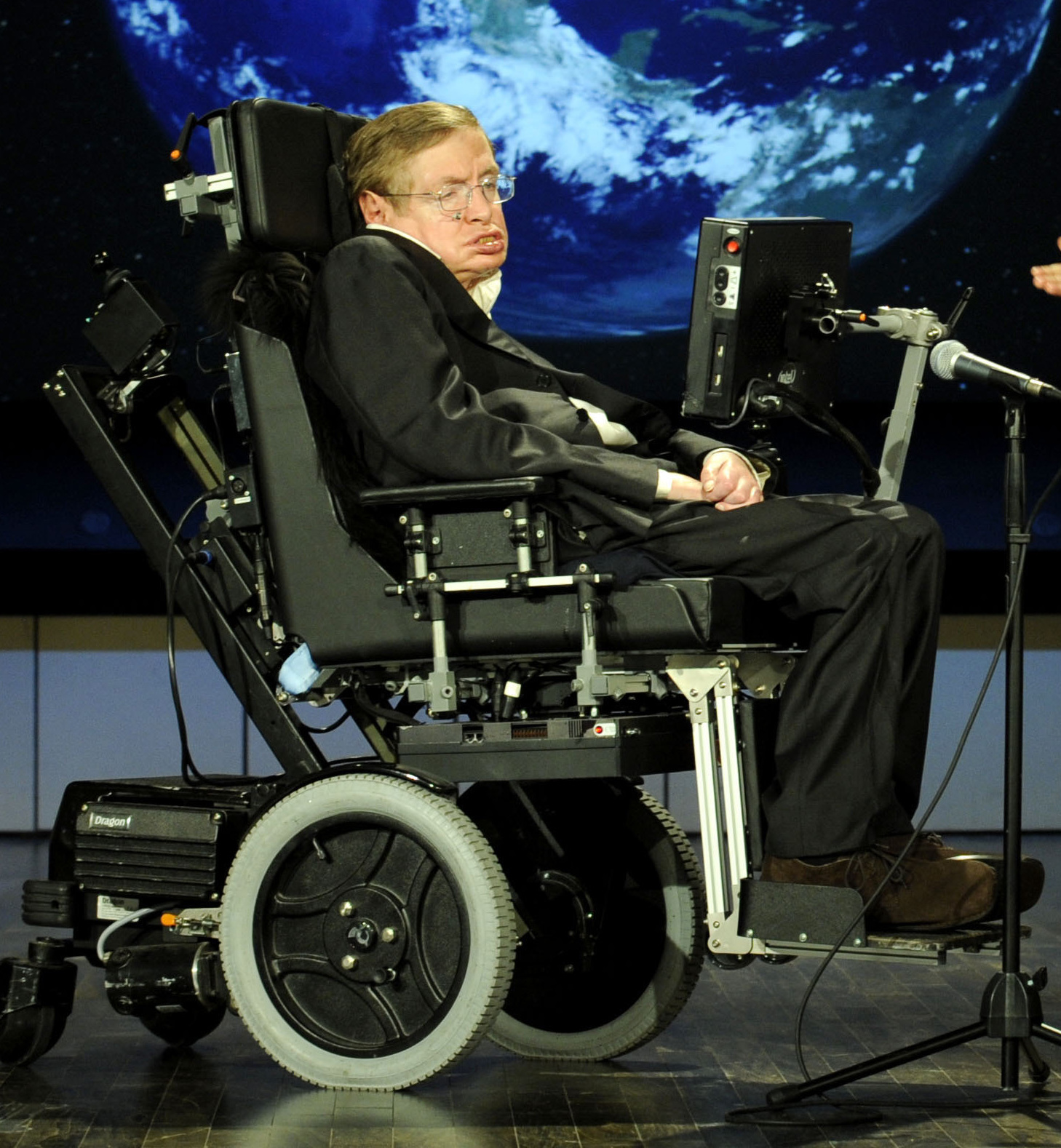
Dr. Stephen Hawking used the "talking wheelchair" or the Versatile Portable Speech Prosthesis. To operate the VSP, Hawking used a thumb switch and a blink-switch that was attached to his glasses to control his computer.

- Talking wheelchairs: paralyzed individuals who have difficulty speaking may use a talking feature on their wheelchairs which was developed by NASA to create synthesized speech for aircraft. "Talking Wheelchairs" or The Versatile Portable Speech Prosthesis (VSP) is a technology that aids in the communication for non-verbal persons. The project started in May 1978 and finished in November 1981. Originally, this technology was created for people who were diagnosed with cerebral palsy who were using traditional electric wheelchairs. This technology is portable and versatile, as well as a highly successful speech prosthesis. However, the nickname "talking wheelchair" has created some separation from the wheelchair itself. The VSP is easily accessible to the person using it by operation of single or multiple switches or by keyboard, and uses a synthetic voice used for verbal speech. The synthetic voice provides communication opportunities that regular speaking persons have such as: communicating with people in a crowd, communicating in the dark, communicating with people who have vision problems, communicating with younger children, communicating when the listener's back is turned, etc. The synthetic voice also provides a sense of personal and individual communication as the keyboard can be programmed with "fun" words as well as "throw-away lines". The first version of the versatile portable speech prosthesis was completed in May 1979. There were additions made to the VSP in November 1979 and provided more controls for speech. By November 1979, VSP was capable of taking English text and successful in putting out English speech. The user was also able to store and retrieve vocabulary, as well as edit and create new vocabulary. The controls and plugs on the VSP were versatile allowing plug-and-go ability. With the limitations of ASR systems, Portable Speech Prosthesis have moved to the use of Silent Speech Recognition (SSR). The goal of using SSR with VSP is to recognize information that is speech related with some modals such as surface electromyography (sEMG). Speech recognition models used algorithms for extracting speech-related features through the sEMG signals. The patterns of sEMG signals used grammar models to recognize sequences of words. Phoneme-based models were also used when recognizing vocabulary of previously untrained words. Multi-point sensors were used with these algorithms in which they could be arranged in a flexible way to record the measurements of sEMG signals from the small articular muscles found in the human face and neck.
- Collapsible, lightweight wheelchairs: wheelchairs designed for portability that can be folded and put into trunks of cars. They rely on synthetic materials that NASA developed for its air and space craft
- Surgically implantable heart pacemaker: these devices depend on technologies developed by NASA for use with satellites. They communicate information about the activity of the pacemaker, such as how much time remains before the batteries need to be replaced.
- Implantable heart defibrillator: this tool continuously monitors heart activity and can deliver an electric shock to restore heartbeat regularity.
- EMS communications: technology used to communicate telemetry between Earth and space was developed by NASA to monitor the health of astronauts in space from the ground. Ambulances use this same technology to send information—like EKG readings—from patients in transport to hospitals. This allows faster and better treatment.
- Weightlessness therapy: The weightlessness of space can allow some individuals with limited mobility on Earth—even those normally confined to wheelchairs—the freedom to move about with ease. Physicist Stephen Hawking took advantage of weightlessness in NASA's Vomit Comet aircraft in 2007. This idea also led to the development of the Anti-Gravity Treadmill from NASA technology, which employs "differential air pressure to mimic...gravity".

=== Ultrasound microgravity ===
The Advanced Diagnostic Ultrasound in Microgravity Study is funded by the National Space Biomedical Research Institute and involves the use of ultrasound among Astronauts including former ISS Commanders Leroy Chiao and Gennady Padalka who are guided by remote experts to diagnose and potentially treat hundreds of medical conditions in space. This study has a widespread impact and has been extended to cover professional and Olympic sports injuries as well as medical students. It is anticipated that remote guided ultrasound will have application on Earth in emergency and rural care situations. Findings from this study were submitted for publication to the journal Radiology aboard the International Space Station; the first article submitted in space.

== See also ==
- Artificial gravity
- Aviation medicine
- Bioastronautics
- Effect of spaceflight on the human body
- Fatigue and sleep loss during spaceflight
- Intervertebral disc damage and spaceflight
- List of microorganisms tested in outer space
- Mars analog habitat
- Medical treatment during spaceflight
- Microgravity University
- Reduced-gravity aircraft
- Renal stone formation in space
- Spaceflight osteopenia
- Spaceflight radiation carcinogenesis
- Space food
- Space nursing
- Space Nursing Society
- Space pharmacology
- Team composition and cohesion in spaceflight missions
- Visual impairment due to intracranial pressure
