= Illness and injuries during spaceflight =

Illnesses and injuries during space missions are a range of medical conditions and injuries that may occur during space flights. Some of these medical conditions occur due to the changes withstood by the human body during space flight itself, while others are injuries that could have occurred on Earth's surface. A non-exhaustive list of these conditions and their probability of occurrence can be found in the following sources:

- Records of medical problems that were encountered by astronauts during space flights
- Information on medical conditions that occurred during expeditions on Earth in extreme environments (submarine, alpine, Arctic and Antarctic expeditions, expeditions to other remote ground-based locations, etc.) or NASA's Extreme Environment Mission Operations
- Medical studies regarding the probabilities of diseases and injuries due to age
- Pre- and post-flight examination of astronauts and cosmonauts

Table 8-1. In-flight Medical events for U.S. Astronauts during the Space Shuttle Program (STS-1 through STS-89, April 1981 to January 1998)
| Medical Event or System by ICD9* Category | Number | Percent of Total |
|---|---|---|
| Space adaptation syndrome | 788 | 42.2 |
| Nervous system and sense organs | 318 | 17.0 |
| Digestive system | 163 | 8.7 |
| Skin and subcutaneous tissue | 151 | 8.1 |
| Injuries or trauma | 141 | 7.6 |
| Musculoskeletal system and connective tissue | 132 | 7.1 |
| Respiratory system | 83 | 4.4 |
| Behavioral signs and symptoms | 34 | 1.8 |
| Infectious diseases | 26 | 1.4 |
| Genitourinary system | 23 | 1.2 |
| Circulatory system | 6 | 0.3 |
| Endocrine, nutritional, metabolic, and immunity disorders | 2 | 0.1 |
*International Classification of Diseases, 9th Ed.

Results for in-flight illness rates can be found in publications such as The Journal of Emergency Medicine, the Annals of Emergency Medicine, and the Journal of Aviation, Space, and Environmental Medicine. Information on these rates can also be obtained from NASA's cfm Longitudinal Study of Astronaut Health database at the Lyndon B. Johnson Space Center. This study lists a few of the conditions that could occur and their probabilities of occurrence.

== Non-emergency medical conditions ==
Most of the medical conditions that happen in space are not medical emergencies and can be treated on board. About 75% of all astronauts have taken medication during shuttle missions for conditions such as motion sickness, headache, sleeplessness, and back pain. Other common conditions include minor trauma, burns, dermatological and musculoskeletal injuries, respiratory illnesses and genitourinary problems.

== Emergency medical conditions ==
Research on the medical emergencies that may occur in space include fatal and nonfatal arrhythmia, heart attacks, cardiac arrests, embolisms, massive hemorrhages, renal stone formations, fatal and non-fatal infections, and thrombotic complications. Of these conditions, only arrhythmia, renal colics, and infections have occurred in the history of spaceflight. The arrhythmia cases included occasional premature atrial contractions (PACs) and premature ventricular contractions (PVCs), which happened to 30% of astronauts at some point during periods of intense physical activity. Potentially serious arrhythmia cases (superventricular tachycardia) have also been reported. For example, during the Apollo 15 flight, one crew member experienced ventricular bigeminy; ventricular ectopy was reported on Skylab; and on Mir, a crew member experienced a 14-beat run of ventricular tachycardia.

A case of coronary artery disease (CAD) has not been registered during any human space flight as of May 2014. However, due to the lack of public funding for larger space shuttles following the Columbia shuttle disaster in 2003, NASA has had to rely on the smaller Soyuz shuttles to send crews to space, which increased the waiting time for crewed spaceflights and increased the average age of space crews since the mid-1990s. Since the risk of cardiovascular disease increases as people age, research on these diseases has become more important for space agencies - especially for long-term space missions. Other medical emergencies that have been observed in space include cases of urological and dental emergencies, as well as behavioural and psychiatric problems.

Table 8-3. Medical Events and Recurrences Among Astronauts of All Nationalities on Mir, March 14, 1995, through June 12, 1998.
| Event | Number of Events |
|---|---|
| Superficial injury | 43 |
| Arrhythmia | 32 |
| Musculoskeletal | 29 |
| Headache | 17 |
| Sleeplessness | 13 |
| Fatigue | 17 |
| Contact dermatitis | 5 |
| Surface burn | 5 |
| Conjunctivitis | 4 |
| Acute respiratory infection | 3 |
| Asthenia | 3 |
| Ocular foreign body | 3 |
| Globe contusion | 2 |
| Dental | 2 |
| Constipation | 1 |

Table 8-2. Medical Events Among Seven Astronauts on MIR, March 14, 1995 through June 12, 1998Note: Data from the Russian Space Agency indicate that there were 304 in-flight medical events on board the space station Mir from February 7, 1987 through February 28, 1998. The numbers of astronauts at risk or the incidence per 100 days was not reported.
| Event | Number of Events |
|---|---|
| Musculoskeletal | 7 |
| Skin | 6 |
| Nasal Congestion, irritation | 4 |
| Bruise | 2 |
| Eyes | 2 |
| Gastrointestinal | 2 |
| Psychiatric | 2 |
| Hemorrhoids | 1 |
| Headaches | 1 |
| Sleep disorders | 1 |

In a few cases, astronauts were brought back to Earth due to episodes of renal colic and arrhythmia, shortening their stays in space and possibly ending their missions.

People who are exposed to harsh environments have suffered medical conditions that could be considered as analogs of the space environment. A sample of this information is presented in Tables 8-4 through 8-6. The rate of these conditions is relatively low (10-50 cases per 100,000 people per day) and most were non-emergency (trauma, infection, psychiatric disorders), but they required an evacuation that would be impossible to provide in space. Crews living and working in harsh environments (Antarctic expeditions, submarines, and undersea habitats) had medical emergencies such as intracerebral hemorrhage, stroke, myocardial infarction, appendicitis, and bone fractures as well as cases of cancer and psychiatric illness. However, the overall rate of serious medical or surgical emergencies was low.

The most common emergencies were dental. For 100 British Polaris submarine missions, crew members required 30 fillings and 7 teeth extractions in total. Dental problems have been the cause for a transfer at sea in the U.S. Polaris submarine program. Extractions and fillings have also been required for missions in Antarctica.

The calculated rate of significant illness or injury on submarines, Antarctic expeditions, military aviation and space flight was found to be approximately 0.06 cases per person-year. If we use this data to evaluate the rate of occurrence of a medical emergency to a 2.5-year Mars mission, assuming six crew members, we get a rate of 0.9 cases per people/mission. In other words, one significant medical event could be expected per Mars mission. These estimates are likely to be low, as they do not deal with the unique problems that are associated with the space environment: radiation effects and exposure and physiological adaptation to low gravity.

As for cardiovascular emergencies, the yearly number of cases reported by age group for USAF aviators over 5 years was as follows: 0.0054% (30–34 years), 0.018% (35–39 years), 0.038% (40–44 years), 0.14% (45–49 years) and 0.13% (50–54 years). In total, 21% were cases of sudden death and 61% were diagnosed and treated as myocardial infarction. Despite the physical screening that USAF aviators undergo, the first instance of cardiovascular illnesses in this group required serious medical intervention. This data could apply to the astronaut corps as well, even if they undergo a more extensive medical assessment.

In the submarine program, the most common general surgical condition was appendicitis. A case of death due to appendicitis was also reported among the participants of Antarctic expeditions. Other serious conditions reported in the submarine program were traumatic amputations, fractures, and dislocations. Depression and anxiety were the two most common psychiatric diagnoses made on submarines, and they are frequent among researchers enduring long Antarctic winters.

== Medical conditions due to long-term space flights ==
Radiation exposure could also cause medical problems due to the technical problems involved in the shielding of space craft, especially given the length of missions to Mars. Given that these missions could last several years at the level of technology available in 2014, age-related medical conditions would be likely to occur at the same rate as the general population. These probabilities have been assessed in astronaut pre- and post-flight health databases.

Another problem related to long-term missions has been the design of medical care systems within space craft due to the limited amount of available space. Medical care systems for spaceships must include the technology necessary to heal exposure to toxic chemicals and gases, and chemical and electrical burns. Astronauts may also suffer from trauma aboard and during extra-vehicular activities outside space craft.

Table 8-4. Incidence of Health Disorders and Medical-Surgical Procedures during 136 Submarine Patrols
| Disorder | Number/100,000 Person-days |
|---|---|
| Injury (includes accidents) | 48.8 |
| Respiratory | 24.6 |
| Skin or soft tissue | 19.0 |
| Ill-defined symptoms | 10.5 |
| Infections | 10.0 |
| Procedure | Percentage of All Procedures Performed |
| Wound care, splinting | 42.0 |
| Suturing | 18.7 |
| Cleansing | 8.2 |
| Nail removal | 6.8 |
| Fluorescein eye examination | 4.2 |
| Incision and drainage of abscess | 2.9 |
| Tooth restoration | 2.0 |

Table 8-5. Reasons for 332 Medical Evacuations from All Submarines, U.S. Atlantic Fleet, 1993 to 1996*Rate = 1.9 to 2.3 per person-months
| Reason for Evacuation | Number of Cases |
|---|---|
| Trauma | 71 |
| Psychiatric illness | 41 |
| Chest pain | 34 |
| Infection | 40 |
| Kidney stone | 23 |
| Appendicitis | 21 |
| Dental problem | 31 |
| Other | 71 |
| Total* | 332 |

Table 8-6. ANARE Health Register Illnesses in Antarctica from 1988 to 1997
| Disorder | Number | Percent of Total |
|---|---|---|
| Injury and poisoning | 3,910 | 42.0 |
| Respiratory | 910 | 9.7 |
| Skin, subcutaneous | 899 | 9.6 |
| Nervous system or sensory organs | 702 | 7.5 |
| Digestive | 691 | 7.4 |
| Infection or parasitic | 682 | 7.3 |
| Musculoskeletal or connective tissue | 667 | 7.1 |
| Ill-defined symptoms | 335 | 3.6 |
| Mental | 217 | 2.3 |
