= Spaceflight osteopenia =

Bone loss caused by microgravity

Spaceflight osteopenia refers to the characteristic bone loss that occurs during spaceflight. Astronauts lose an average of more than 1% bone mass per month spent in space. There is concern that during long-duration flights, excessive bone loss and the associated increase in serum calcium ion levels will interfere with execution of mission tasks and result in irreversible skeletal damage.

== History ==
Bone loss has been observed during spaceflight since at least as early as Gemini in the 1960s. Although most early measurements of the amount of bone loss were not reliable, they did show bone loss in Gemini, Soyuz 9, Apollo, Skylab, Salyut 7, Mir, and the International Space Station. William E. Thornton, an astronaut and physician, was one of the biggest proponents of exercise as a way of preventing bone loss.

== Cause ==
Bone remodels in response to stress in order to maintain constant strain energy per bone mass throughout. To do this, it grows more dense in areas experiencing high stress, while resorbing density in areas experiencing low stress. For example, on Mars, where gravity is about one-third that of earth, the gravitational forces acting on astronauts' bodies would be much lower, causing bones to decrease in mass and density.

Average bone loss of 1–2% was recorded in astronauts on Mir each month. This is in comparison to 1–1.5% bone loss in the elderly per year, and 2–3% in postmenopausal women.

== Countermeasures ==
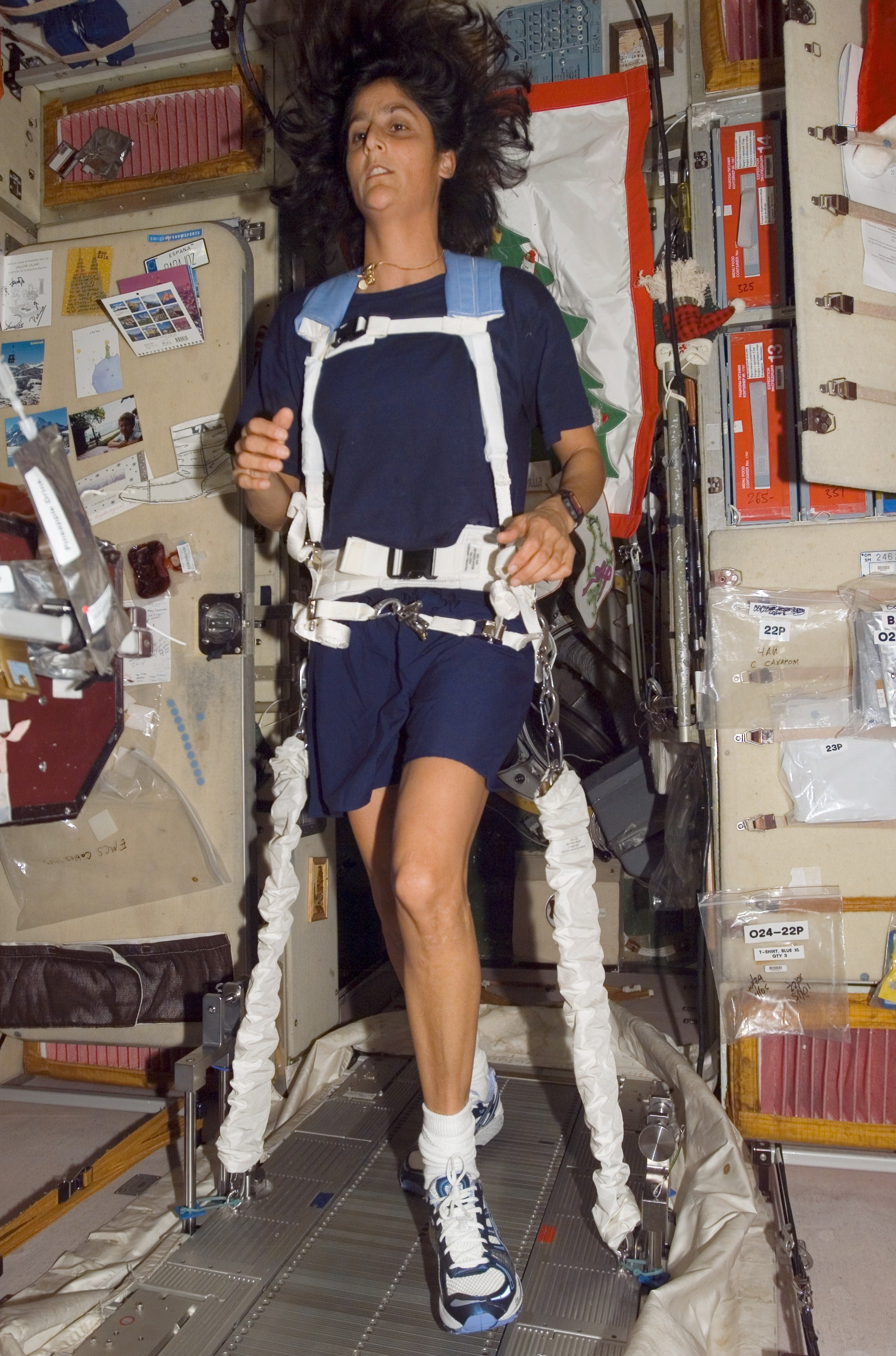
Astronaut Sunita "Suni" Williams bungeed to the TVIS treadmill aboard the International Space Station.

Since Gemini, exercise has been tried as a way of preventing bone loss, but it has not been shown to be successful. This may be in part due to lack of adequately designed studies (no controlled study had been done as of 2005, either in space or using bedrest as an attempt to simulate conditions which lead to bone loss). It is not known whether a different exercise regiment (perhaps including larger loads than past ones) would be effective.

Bone is difficult to regain once it is lost. Data from immobilization studies and from patients with spinal cord injuries support this. Spaceflight data suggest this as well. This suggests that bone loss prevention over postflight bone recovery is an important factor in countermeasure success.

Increasing dietary calcium and vitamin D is a standard countermeasure for osteoporosis. Clay is reportedly used by NASA for retaining calcium.

A variety of drug remedies currently used or proposed for osteoporosis may work for spaceflight, including hormone therapy (estrogen or progestin), selective estrogen receptor modulators, bisphosphonates, teriparatide, and others. Whether they can provide the same benefits for spaceflight as they do for osteoporosis is not yet known.

== See also ==
- Artificial gravity
- Effect of spaceflight on the human body
  - Space medicine
  - Space adaptation syndrome
- Microgravity University
- Reduced-gravity aircraft
- Timeline of longest spaceflights
