= Renal stone formation in space =

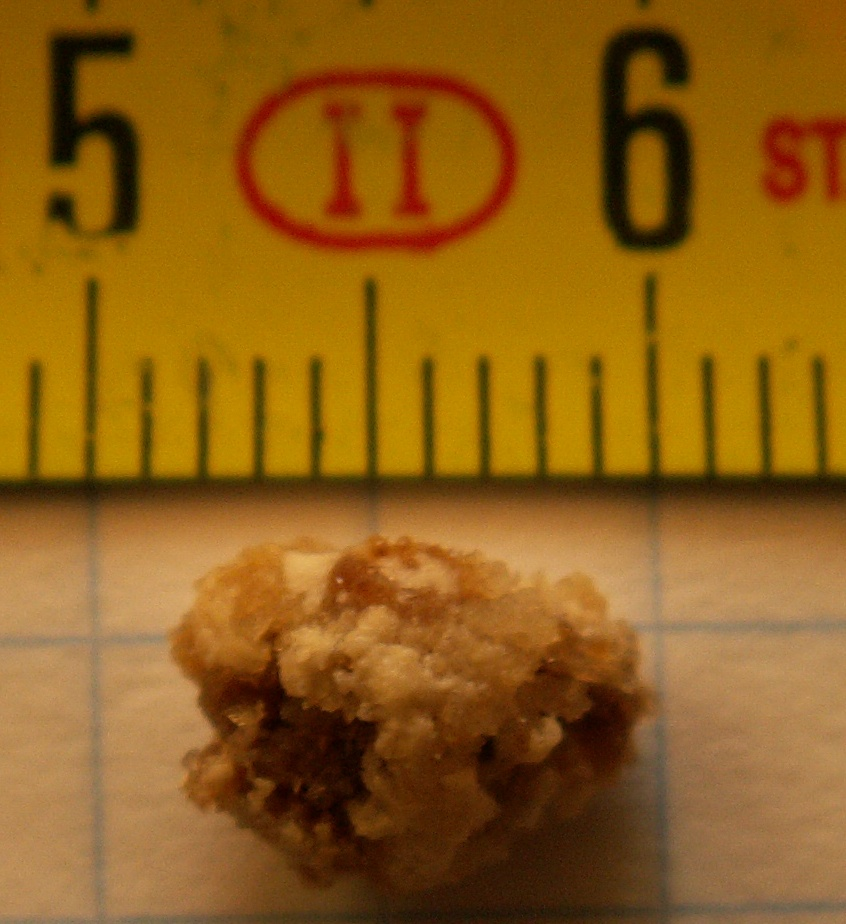
Unidentified kidney stone.

Renal stone formation and passage during space flight can potentially pose a severe risk to crew member health and safety and could affect mission outcome. Although renal stones are routinely and successfully treated on Earth, the occurrence of these during space flight can prove to be problematic.

== Causes and countermeasures ==
=== Causes ===
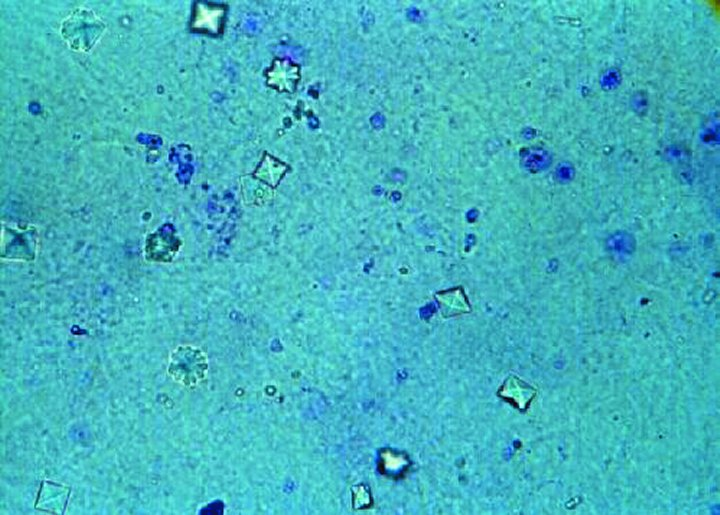
This micrograph shows calcium oxalate crystals in urine. These small crystals can develop to form renal stones. The Renal Stone Risk During Space Flight experiment is conducted aboard the International Space Station.

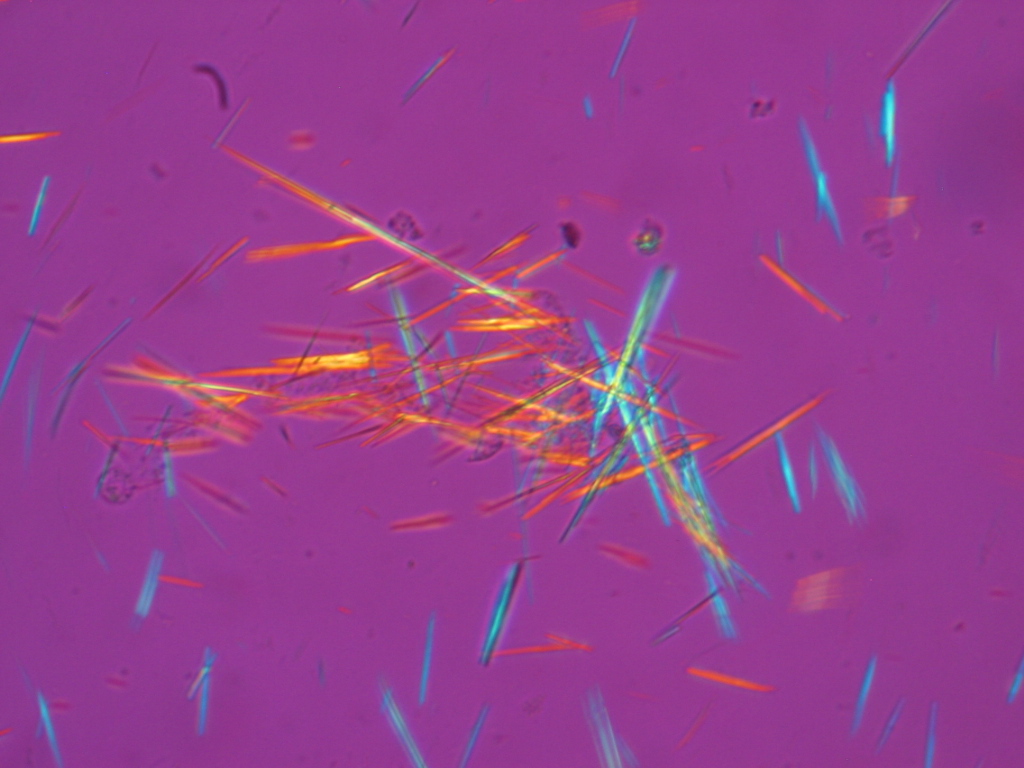
Spiked rods of uric acid crystals from a synovial fluid sample, photographed under polarized light.

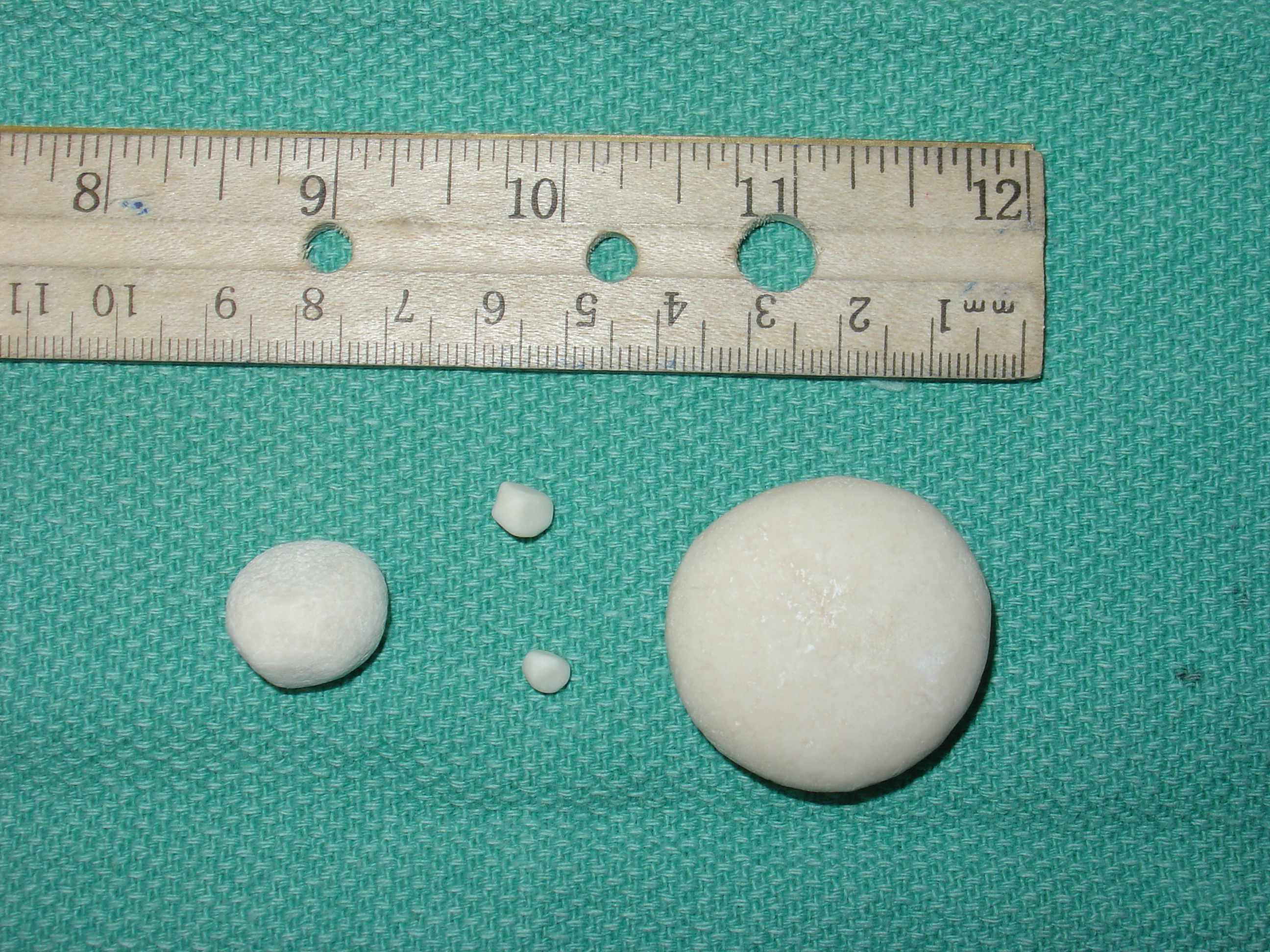
Struvite (magnesium ammonium phosphate) stones removed from a dog's urinary bladder.

Several factors contribute to the formation of renal stones in space. Dietary changes, bone metabolism, dehydration, increased salt intake as well as decreased urine volumes and increased urine saturation are all possible causes of renal stone formation. It has been noted that spaceflight-induced changes in urine biochemistry are conducive for stone formation.

Other possible causes include:

- increased urinary pH
- history of or predisposition to stone formation
- inflight food stability
- preservation of food using salt
- quantity of onboard water supply
- limited nutritional sources
- increased diet of animal protein

The most common renal stone is calcium oxalate and is usually caused by treatable metabolic disorders of hypercalciuria (increased calcium levels in the urine). These stones cause pain with passage and blockage and have been known to recur.

Uric acid stones have similar characteristics as the calcium oxalate stones, but occur much more rarely (approximately 5% of all renal stones). Since they are translucent, they cannot be seen by radiographs.

Struvite stones are generated by infections of urease-containing microorganisms that are capable of hydrolyzing the urea in the urine to carbon dioxide and ammonia. Struvite stones can form when urinary pH rises above 7.2, can fill the renal collection system, and can erode into the renal tissue.

Cystine stones, caused by hereditary cystinuria, begin forming in childhood and can grow large enough to fill the renal collection system.

Calcium phosphate stones, or otherwise called brushite, are caused by high urine pH and a supersaturation of calcium phosphate salt in the urine.

=== Countermeasures ===
It is more cost effective to prevent stone formation during a mission than is it to treat it. Increased fluid intake will increase urine volume and dilute the stone-forming salts to below the upper risk levels. Avoiding foods that are high in fat and high in oxalate (nuts, pepper, chocolate, rhubarb, spinach, dark green vegetables, fruits) can help reduce hyperoxaluria (excessive urinary excretion of oxalate). Reducing the amount of meats and other purine-containing foods suppresses hyperuricosuria (increased amounts of uric acid in the urine).

Oral alkali (such as potassium citrate) raises the urine's pH and helps suppress calcium oxalate crystal formation. This also works by binding the calcium to form calcium citrate (a crystal growth and aggregation inhibitor). Studies have also shown an additive effect of potassium citrate. The ingestion of potassium citrate has been associated with increased bone density as well as the prevention of bone loss by providing an alkali load averting the bone resorbing effect of sodium chloride excess. Potassium citrate has also been shown to reduce bone loss in postmenopausal women and also improves calcium balance in patients with distal renal tubular acidosis

== On the ground ==
Bed rest studies are used as ground-based analogs to space flight environments. During these studies, the rate of bone loss and subsequent urine composition are similar to those observed in space. A recent ground-based study tested the effectiveness of potassium-magnesium citrate (similar to the currently used potassium citrate) as a countermeasure for renal stones.

=== Computer based simulations ===
The Integrated Medical Model (IMM) group at Glenn Research Center in Ohio has been analyzing and optimizing data gathered on renal stone formation since late 2008.

== In space ==
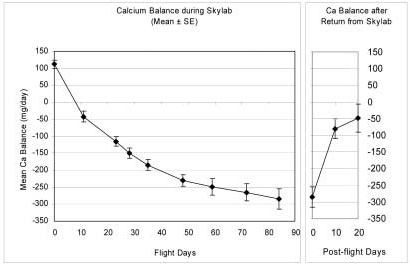
Figure 4-1. Calcium balance during and after Skylab missions. Adapted from Rambaut and Johnston (1979)

Since the risk of renal stone formation could result in the loss of a crew member to a mission, regular testing is conducted. To date, there has been only one inflight instance of renal stone formation (described in detail in Valentin Lebedev's book, Diary of a Cosmonaut: Two hundred eleven days in space).

=== Skylab ===
The Skylab missions were the first missions that extended past several days in duration. Testing during these missions showed that calcium excretion increased early in flight and almost exceeded the upper threshold for normal excretion.

=== Shuttle missions ===
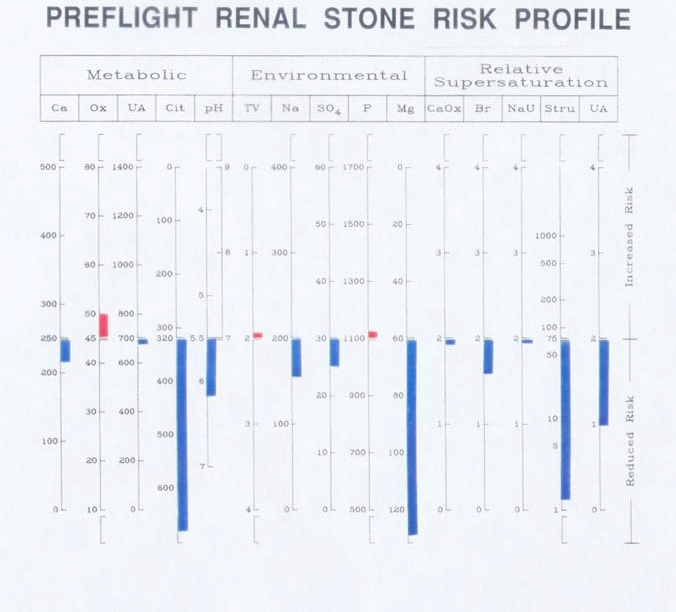
Figure 4-2a. Representative preflight renal stone risk profile determined in a single crew member before a short-duration flight (i.e., Space Shuttle). BLUE bars represent decreased risk, RED bars represent increased risk.

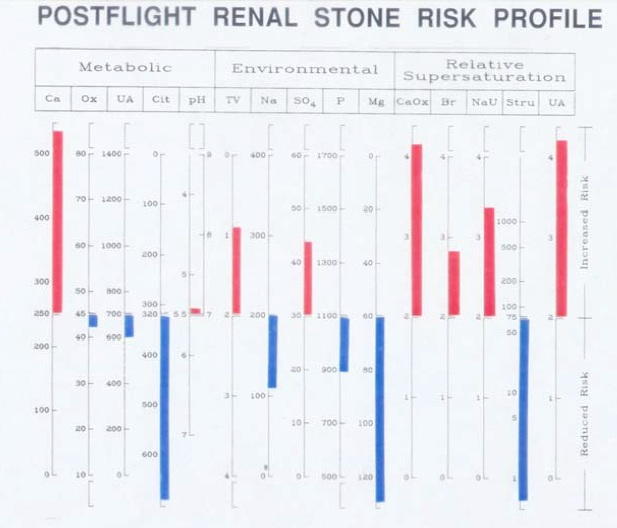
Figure 4-2b. Representative postflight renal stone risk profile determined in the same crewmember immediately following a short-duration flight (i.e., Space Shuttle). Blue bars represent decreased risk, red bars represent increased risk.

Investigations of environmental and biochemical renal stone formation risk factors on short and long duration Shuttle missions showed that an increased risk of calcium oxalate and uric acid stone formation was evident immediately post-flight. Nutrition, urinary pH and volume output were found to be the largest contributing factors for these formations. During longer Shuttle missions, the risk for stone formation rapidly increases throughout the mission and persists after landing.

Figures 4-2a and 4-2b show the relative risks of stone formation in a representative crewmember of a space shuttle flight. A retrospective medical chart review for stone formation in U.S. astronauts reported that 12 different astronauts reported 14 cases of renal stone formations with 9 of those instances occurring in the postflight period.

=== Shuttle–Mir missions ===
Data gathered during 129- to 208-day Shuttle–Mir missions suggest that the spaceflight environment and subsequent return to Earth change the composition of the astronauts' urine and promoted the formation of renal stones. This data shows that there was an increased risk for calcium oxalate and calcium phosphate stones during flight, and an increased risk for calcium oxalate and uric acid stones immediately after flight. This post-flight stone development could be attributed to low urine volumes and higher urinary pH.

=== International Space Station (ISS) ===
Flight experiment 96-E057, Renal stone risk during spaceflight: Assessment and countermeasure evaluation, was conducted on Expeditions 3, 4, 5, 6, 8, 11, 12, 13, and 14. The aim of this experiment was to evaluate the in-flight effectiveness of potassium citrate as a countermeasure against the formation of renal stones during long duration space flight. The results of this experiment described the renal stone forming potential in crewmembers as a function of time in space as well as the stone forming potential during the postflight period.

=== Future exploration missions ===
Exploration missions pose an extra threat to mission outcome and crewmember health and safety due to the longer duration of the mission as well as the greater distances traveled. Since acute illness caused by the formation and passage of renal stones could cause the loss of a crewmember to a mission, it is critical that valid countermeasures are put in place before exploration missions begin.

Table 4-4 outlines specific scenarios and time considerations for exploration missions.

Table 4-4. Definition of Exploration Mission Durations
Duration Length	Mission Location	Transit Time To Location (in days)	Length Of Stay (in days)	Transit Time Back To Earth (in days)
Short	Moon	3	8	3
Long	Moon	5	170	5
Short	Mars	162	40	162
Long	Mars	189	540	189
