= Astronautical hygiene =

Evaluation and mitigation system

Astronautical hygiene evaluates, and mitigates, hazards and health risks to those working in low-gravity environments. The discipline of astronautical hygiene includes such topics as the use and maintenance of life support systems, the risks of the extravehicular activity, the risks of exposure to chemicals or radiation, the characterization of hazards, human factor issues, and the development of risk management strategies. Astronautical hygiene works side by side with space medicine to ensure that astronauts are healthy and safe when working in space.

== Overview ==
When astronauts travel in space, they are exposed to numerous hazards, such as radiation, microbes in the spacecraft, and planetary surface toxic dust, etc. During a space voyage, astronautical hygienists work on collecting data concerning a multitude of subjects. Once the data has been collected, they then analyze the data to determine, among other things, the risks to human health due to exposure to the various chemicals within the spacecraft as well as other toxins during their flight. From that, the hygienists can determine the appropriate measures to take to mitigate exposure of the astronauts to the harmful chemicals.

Once on the surface of a moon or planet, the astronautical hygienist would also collect data on the nature of the dust, and the levels of radiation on the surface. From this analysis, they would determine the risks to the astronauts' health and will conclude how to prevent or control exposure.

The main roles of the astronautical hygienist are as follows:

1. To initiate and participate in research where a competent assessment of the risks to health are critical, e.g., in the development of effective dust mitigation strategies for lunar exploration.
2. To be actively involved in designing hazard mitigation techniques, e.g. spacesuits with low dust retention/release and ease of movement.
3. To provide in-flight troubleshooting e.g. for identifying the hazard, assessing the health risks and for determining the mitigation measures.
4. To advise governments such as the UK Space Agency on the most cost-effective risk mitigation measures for crewed spaceflight.
5. To act as a central link between the other space science disciplines.
6. To provide information, instruction and training on standard-setting, on exposure health effects, on hazard identification, and the use of controls.
7. To provide a holistic approach to protecting an astronaut's health.

The Orion spacecraft (or Multi-Purpose Crew Vehicle) is an American-European interplanetary spacecraft intended to carry a crew of four astronauts to destinations at or beyond low Earth orbit (LEO). Currently under development by the National Aeronautics and Space Administration (NASA) and the European Space Agency (ESA) for launch on the Space Launch System. Orion will contain potentially hazardous material such as ammonia, hydrazine, freon, nitrogen tetroxide, and volatile organic compounds and it will be necessary to prevent or control exposure to these substances during flight. Astronautical hygienists in the United States together with colleagues in the European Union, individual United Kingdom astronautical hygienists and space medicine experts are developing measures that will mitigate exposure to these substances.

Dr. John R. Cain (a UK government health risk management expert) was the first scientist to define the new discipline of astronautical hygiene. The establishment of the UK Space Agency and the UK Space Life and Biomedical Sciences Association (UK Space LABS) see the development and application of the principles of astronautical hygiene as an important means to protect the health of astronauts working (and eventually living) in space.

== Cleaning and waste management ==
=== Personal hygiene ===
Cleaning and waste disposal issues arise when dealing with low gravity environments. On the International Space Station, there are no showers, and astronauts instead take short sponge baths, with one cloth used to wash, and another used to rinse. Since surface tension causes water and soap bubbles to adhere to the skin, very little water is needed. Special non-rinsing soap is used, as well as special non-rinsing shampoos. Since a flush toilet would not work in low gravity environments, a special toilet was designed, that has suction capability. While the design is nearly the same, the concept uses the flow of air, rather than water. In the case of the space shuttle, waste water is vented overboard into space, and solid waste is compressed, and removed from the storage area once the shuttle returns to Earth. The current toilet model was first flown on STS-54 in 1993, and features an unlimited storage capacity, compared to only 14-day capacity of the original shuttle toilets, and the new model has an odor-free environment.

Inside the ISS, astronauts wear ordinary clothes. The clothes are not washed, and are typically worn until being considered too dirty, at which point they are taken back to Earth as rubbish, or ejected as waste to burn up in the atmosphere. In 2020, per agreement between NASA and Procter & Gamble, research into space-usable detergents began; in 2021, an experimental detergent was launched aboard SpaceX CRS-24.

=== Control of gases in spacecraft ===
Toxic gases are produced as an off-gassing from the astronauts and non-metallic materials e.g. surface coatings, adhesives, elastomers, solvents, cleaning agents, heat exchanger liquids, etc. Above specific concentrations, if inhaled, the gases could affect the ability of the crew to carry out their duties effectively.

Most of the toxicological data on gas exposure is based on the 8-hour work period of the terrestrial worker and is therefore unsuitable for spacecraft work. New exposure times (astronautical hygiene data) have had to be established for space missions where exposure can be uninterrupted for up to 2 weeks or longer with no daily or weekend periods.

Exposure limits are based on:

- "Normal" spacecraft operating conditions.
- An "emergency" situation.

In normal conditions, there are trace contaminant gases such as ammonia from normal off-gassing at ambient temperatures and elevated temperatures. Other gases arise from the breathing gas supply reservoirs and crew members themselves. In emergencies, gases can arise from overheating, spills, a rupture in the coolant loop (ethylene glycol) and from the pyrolysis of non-metallic components. Carbon monoxide is a major concern for space crews; this was evident during the Apollo missions. The emitted trace gases can be controlled using lithium hydroxide filters to trap carbon dioxide and activated carbon filters to trap other gases.

Gases in the cabin can be tested using gas chromatography, mass spectrometry and infra-red spectrophotometry. Samples of air from the spacecraft are examined both before and after flight for their gas concentrations. The activated carbon filters can be examined for evidence of trace gases. The concentrations measured can be compared with the appropriate exposure limits. If the exposures are high then the risks to health increase. The ongoing sampling of the hazardous substances is essential so that appropriate action can be taken if exposure is high.

A large number of volatile substances detected during the flight are mostly within their threshold limit values and NASA Spacecraft Maximum Allowable Concentration Limits. If spacecraft cabin exposure to specific chemicals is below their TLVs and SMACs then it is expected that the risks to health following inhalation exposure will be reduced.

=== Spacecraft maximum allowable concentrations ===
SMACs guide chemical exposures during normal as well as emergency operations aboard spacecraft. Short-term SMACs refer to concentrations of airborne substances such as gas and vapour that will not compromise the performance of specific tasks by astronauts during emergency conditions or cause serious toxic effects. Long-term SMACs are intended to avoid adverse health effects and to prevent any noticeable changes in the crew's performance under continuous exposure to chemicals for as long as 180 days.

Astronautical hygiene data needed for developing the SMACs include:

- chemical-physical characterization of the toxic chemical
- animal toxicity studies
- human clinical studies
- accidental human exposures
- epidemiological studies
- in-vitro toxicity studies

== Lunar dust hazards ==
Lunar dust or regolith is the layer of particles on the Moon's surface and is approximately <100 um. The grain shapes tend to be elongated. Inhalation exposure to this dust can cause breathing difficulties because the dust is toxic. It can also cloud astronauts' visors when working on the Moon's surface. Furthermore, it adheres to spacesuits both mechanically (because of barbed shapes) and electrostatically. During Apollo, the dust was found to cause wear in the fabric of the spacesuit.

During lunar exploration, it will be necessary to evaluate the risks of exposure to the Moon dust and thereby instigate the appropriate exposure controls. Required measurements may include measuring exospheric-dust concentrations, surface electric fields, dust mass, velocity, charge, and its plasma characteristics.

=== Deposition of inhaled particles ===
The extent of the inflammatory response in the lung will depend on where the lunar dust particles are deposited. In the 1G deposition, the more central airways will reduce the transport of the fine particles to the lung periphery. On the Moon with fractional gravity, the inhaled fine particles will be deposited in more peripheral regions of the lung. Therefore, because of the reduced sedimentation rate in lunar gravity, fine particles of dust will deposit in the alveolar region of the lung. This will exacerbate the potential for lung damage.

=== Controlling dust exposure ===
The use of high-gradient magnetic separation techniques should be developed to remove dust from the spacesuits following exploration as the fine fraction of the lunar dust is magnetic. Furthermore, vacuums can be used to remove dust from spacesuits.

Mass spectrometry has been used to monitor spacecraft cabin air quality. The results obtained can then be used to assess the risks during spaceflight for example, by comparing the concentrations of VOCs with their SMACs. If the levels are too high then appropriate remedial action will be required to reduce the concentrations and the risks to health.

== Microbial hazards ==
During spaceflight, there will be the transfer of microbes between crew members. Several bacterial associated diseases were experienced by the crew in Skylab 1. The microbial contamination in the Skylab was found to be very high. Staphylococcus aureus and Aspergillus spp have commonly been isolated from the air and surfaces during several space missions. The microbes do not sediment in microgravity which results in persisting airborne aerosols and high microbial densities in-cabin air in particular if the cabin air filtering systems are not well maintained. During one mission, an increase in the number and spread of fungi and pathogenic streptococci were found.

Urine collection devices build up the bacterium Proteus mirabilis, which is associated with urinary tract infection. For this reason, astronauts may be susceptible to urinary tract infection. An example is the Apollo 13 mission, during which the Apollo Lunar Module pilot experienced an acute urinary tract infection which required two weeks of antibiotic therapy to resolve.

Biofilm that may contain a mixture of bacteria and fungi have the potential to damage electronic equipment by oxidising various components e.g. copper cables. Such organisms flourish because they survive on the organic matter released from the astronaut's skin. Organic acids produced by microbes, in particular fungi, can corrode steel, glass and plastic. Furthermore, because of the increase in exposure to radiation on a spacecraft, there are likely to be more microbial mutations.

Because of the potential for microbes to cause infection in the astronauts and to be able to degrade various components that may be vital for the functioning of the spacecraft, the risks must be assessed and, where appropriate, manage the levels of microbial growth controlled by the use of good astronautical hygiene. For example, by frequently sampling the space-cabin air and surfaces to detect early signs of a rise in microbial contamination, keeping surfaces clean by the use of disinfected clothes, by ensuring that all equipment is well maintained in particular the life support systems and by regular vacuuming of the spacecraft to remove dust etc. It is likely that during the first crewed missions to Mars that the risks from microbial contamination could be underestimated unless the principles of good astronautical hygiene practice are applied. Further research in this field is therefore needed so that the risks of exposure can be evaluated and the necessary measures to mitigate microbial growth are developed.

=== Microbes and microgravity in space ===
There are over one hundred strains of bacteria and fungi that have been identified from crewed space missions. These microorganisms survive and propagate in space. Much effort is being made to ensure that the risks from exposure to the microbes are significantly reduced. Spacecraft are sterilized as good control practice by flushing with antimicrobial agents such as ethylene oxide and methyl chloride, and astronauts are quarantined for several days before a mission. However, these measures only reduce microbe populations rather than eliminate them. Microgravity may increase the virulence of specific microbes. It is therefore important that the mechanisms responsible for this problem are studied and the appropriate controls are implemented to ensure that astronauts, in particular, those that are immunocompromised, are not affected.

== Anatomical hazards due to environment ==
The work of Cain (2007) and others have seen the need to understand the hazards and risks of working in a low gravity environment. The general effects on the body of space flight or reduced gravity for example, as may occur on the Moon or during the exploration of Mars include changed physical factors such as decreased weight, fluid pressure, convection and sedimentation. These changes will affect the body fluids, the gravity receptors and the weight-bearing structures. The body will adapt to these changes over the time spent in space. There will also be psychosocial changes caused by travelling in the confined space of a spacecraft. Astronautical hygiene (and space medicine) needs to address these issues, in particular, the likely behavioural changes to the crew otherwise the measures developed to control the potential health hazards and risks will not be sustained. Any decrease in communication, performance and problem solving, for example, could have devastating effects.

During space exploration, there will be the potential for contact dermatitis to develop in particular if there is exposure to skin sensitisers such as acrylates. Such skin disease could jeopardise a mission unless appropriate measures are taken to identify the source of the exposure, to assess the health risks, and thereby determine the means to mitigate exposure.

=== Noise ===
Fans, compressors, motors, transformers, pumps etc. on the International Space Station (ISS) all generate noise. As more equipment is required on the space station, there is a potential for more noise. Astronaut Tom Jones indicated the noise was more of an issue in the earlier days of the space station when astronauts wore hearing protection. Today, hearing protection is not required and sleeping chambers are soundproofed.

The Russian space program has never given a high priority to the noise levels experienced by its cosmonauts (e.g. on Mir the noise levels reached 70–72 dB). Less than 75 decibels are unlikely to cause hearing loss. See noise-induced hearing loss for more information. This could result in hazard warning alarms not being heard against the background noise. To reduce the noise risks NASA engineers built hardware with inbuilt noise reduction. A depressurized pump producing 100 dB can have the noise levels reduced to 60 dB by fitting four isolation mounts. The use of hearing protectors are not encouraged because they block out alarm signals. More research is necessary for this field as well as in other astronautical hygiene areas e.g. measures to reduce the risks of exposure to radiation, methods to create artificial gravity, more sensitive sensors to monitor hazardous substances, improved life support systems and more toxicological data on the Martian and lunar dust hazards.

== Radiation hazards ==
Space radiation consists of high energy particles such as protons, alpha and heavier particles originating from such sources as galactic cosmic rays, energetic solar particles from solar flares and trapped radiation belts. Space station crew exposures will be much higher than those on Earth and unshielded astronauts may experience serious health effects if unprotected. Galactic cosmic radiation is extremely penetrating and it may not be possible to build shields of sufficient depth to prevent or control exposure.

=== Trapped radiation ===
The Earth's magnetic field is responsible for the formation of the trapped radiation belts that surround Earth. The ISS orbits at between 200 nautical miles (370 km) and 270 nautical miles (500 km), known as a Low Earth Orbit (LEO). Trapped radiation doses in LEO decrease during solar maximum and increase during solar minimum. Highest exposures occur in the South Atlantic Anomaly region.

=== Galactic cosmic radiation ===
This radiation originates from outside the Solar System and consists of ionized charged atomic nuclei from hydrogen, helium and uranium. Due to its energy, the galactic cosmic radiation is very penetrating. Thin to moderate shielding is effective in reducing the projected equivalent dose but as shield thickness increases, shield effectiveness drops.

=== Solar Particle Events ===
These are injections of energetic electrons, protons, alpha particles into interplanetary space during solar flare eruptions. During periods of maximum solar activity, the frequency and intensity of solar flares will increase. The solar proton events generally occur only once or twice a solar cycle.

The intensity and spectral disruption of SPEs have a significant impact on shield effectiveness. The solar flares occur without much warning so they are difficult to predict. SPEs will pose the greatest threat to unprotected crews in polar, geo-stationary or interplanetary orbits. Fortunately, most SPEs are short-lived (less than 1 to 2 days) which allows for small volume "storm shelters" to be feasible.

=== Other ===
Radiation hazards may also come from man-made sources, for example, medical investigations, radio-isotopic power generators or from small experiments as on Earth. Lunar and Martian missions may include either nuclear reactors for power or related nuclear propulsion systems. Astronautical hygienists will need to assess the risks from these other sources of radiation and take appropriate action to mitigate exposure.

Laboratory tests reported in the Journal of Plasma Physics and Controlled Fusion indicate that a magnetic "umbrella" could be developed to deflect harmful space radiation away from the spacecraft. Such an "umbrella" would protect astronauts from the super-fast charged particles that stream away from the Sun. It would provide a protective field around the spacecraft similar to the magnetosphere that envelops the Earth. This form of control against solar radiation will be necessary if humans are to explore the planets and reduce the health risks from exposure to the deadly effects of radiation. More research is necessary to develop and test a practical system.

== See also ==
- Bioastronautics
- Effect of spaceflight on the human body
- International Space Station

== Sources ==
- British Interplanetary Society (BIS) Spaceflight – Letters and emails (September 2006, p 353)
- BIS Spaceflight – Letters and emails (December 2007, p 477)
