= Bioastronautics =

Academic discipline

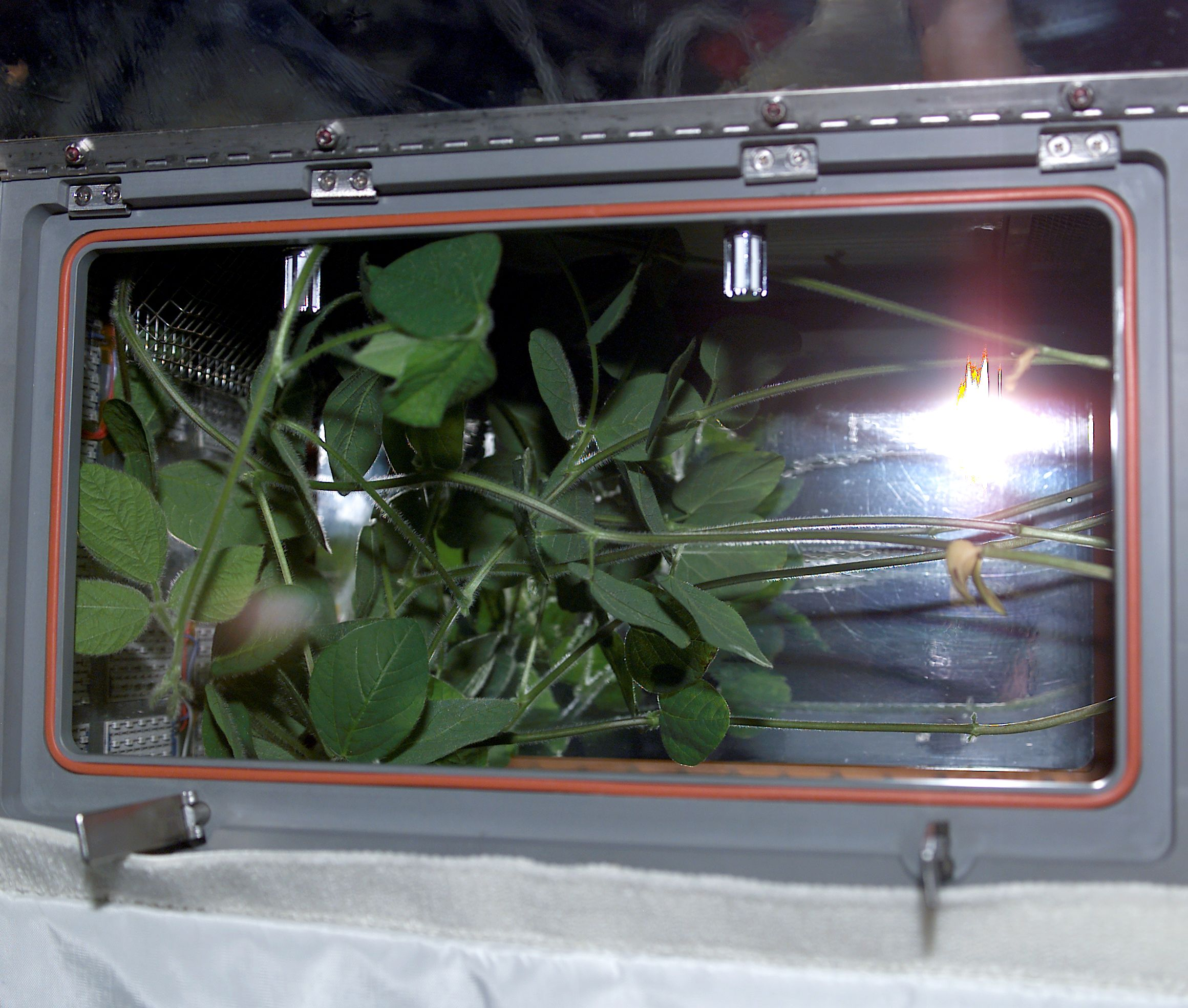
Soybeans being grown on the International Space Station as part of an experiment in 2002

Bioastronautics is the scientific study of life in outer space, and an interdisciplinary field between biology and astronautics. It is concerned with biological and medical challenges associated with space environment, for both humans and other living organisms, and is involved in the design of space vehicle payloads, space habitats, and life-support systems. Space medicine is a related field of study concerning specifically the medical aspects of human biology in space.

Bioastronautics includes many similarities with its sister discipline astronautical hygiene; they both study the hazards that humans may encounter during a space flight. However, astronautical hygiene differs in many respects e.g. in this discipline, once a hazard is identified, the exposure risks are then assessed and the most effective measures determined to prevent or control exposure and thereby protect the health of the astronaut. Astronautical hygiene is an applied scientific discipline that requires knowledge and experience of many fields including bioastronautics, space medicine, ergonomics etc. The skills of astronautical hygiene are already being applied for example, to characterise Moon dust and design the measures to mitigate exposure during lunar exploration, to develop accurate chemical monitoring techniques and use the results in the setting SMACs.

Of particular interest from a biological perspective are the effects of reduced gravitational force felt by inhabitants of spacecraft. Often referred to as "microgravity", the lack of sedimentation, buoyancy, or convective flows in fluids results in a more quiescent cellular and intercellular environment primarily driven by chemical gradients. Certain functions of organisms are mediated by gravity, such as gravitropism in plant roots and negative gravitropism in plant stems, and without this stimulus growth patterns of organisms onboard spacecraft often diverge from their terrestrial counterparts. Additionally, metabolic energy normally expended in overcoming the force of gravity remains available for other functions. This may take the form of accelerated growth in organisms as diverse as worms like C. elegans to miniature parasitoid wasps such as Spangia endius. It may also be used in the augmented production of secondary metabolites such as the vinca alkaloids Vincristine and Vinblastine in the rosy periwinkle (Catharanthus roseus), whereby space grown specimens often have higher concentrations of these constituents that on earth are present in only trace amounts.

== Engineering considerations ==
From an engineering perspective, facilitating the delivery and exchange of air, food, and water, and the processing of waste products is also challenging. The transition from expendable physicochemical methods to sustainable bioregenerative systems that function as a robust miniature ecosystem is another goal of bioastronautics in facilitating long duration space travel. Such systems are often termed Closed Ecological Life Support Systems (CELSS).

== Medical considerations ==
From a medical perspective, long duration space flight also has physiological impacts on astronauts. Accelerated bone decalcification, similar to osteopenia and osteoporosis on Earth, is just one such condition. Another serious concern is the effects of space travel upon the kidneys. Current estimates of these effects upon the kidneys indicates that unless some kind of effective additional remedial technology against kidney damage is employed, astronauts who have been exposed to micro-gravity, reduced gravity, and Galactic radiation for 3 years or so on a Mars mission may have to return to Earth while attached to dialysis machines. The study of the potential effects of space travel is useful not only for advancing methods of the safe habitation of space, and the travel through space, but also in uncovering ways to more effectively treat closely related terrestrial ailments.

== NASA's Bioastronautics library ==
NASA's Johnson Space Center in Houston, Texas maintains a Bioastronautics Library. The one-room facility provides a collection of textbooks, reference books, conference proceedings, and academic journals related to bioastronautics topics. Because the library is located within secure government property (not part of Space Center Houston, the official visitors center of JSC), it is not generally accessible to the public.

== See also ==
- Effect of spaceflight on the human body
- Life support system
- Space habitation
- Locomotion in space
- Reduced muscle mass, strength and performance in space
- Space food
- Astronautical hygiene
- Spaceflight radiation carcinogenesis
- Space medicine
- Space sexology
- Sex in space
- Space tourism
- Space-based economy
- List of spaceflight-related accidents and incidents
- Writing in space
- Space art#Art in space
- Religion in space
- Organisms at high altitude
- Astrobiology
- Astrobotany
- Plants in space
