= List of topics in space =

List of topics in space; topics as related to outer space.

- Accidents in space
- Animals in space
- Architecture in space
- Batteries in space
- Christmas in space
- Corrosion in space
- Death in space
- Dogs in space
- Dust in space
- Economy in space (Mining in space)
- Garbage in space
- Humans in space
- Hygiene in space
- Industry in space
- Interstellar and circumstellar molecules
- Locomotion in space
- Medicine in space
- Mice in space
- Microorganisms tested in outer space
- Monkeys and apes in space
- Music in space
- Nuclear power in space
- Neuroscience in space
- Plants in space
- Politics of outer space
- Religion in space
- Sex in space
- Solar power in space
  - Solar power in space for Earth
- Telescopes in space
- Tourism in space
- War in space
- Weapons in space
- Weather in space
- Women in space
- Writing in space

== See also ==
- Outer space
- Spaceflight
- Space-based radar
- Space-based solar power
- Space and survival
- Space science
- Space station
- Space technology
