= Neuroscience in space =

Space neuroscience or astroneuroscience is the scientific study of the central nervous system (CNS) functions during spaceflight. Living systems can integrate the inputs from the senses to navigate in their environment and to coordinate posture, locomotion, and eye movements. Gravity has a fundamental role in controlling these functions. In weightlessness during spaceflight, integrating the sensory inputs and coordinating motor responses is harder to do because gravity is no longer sensed during free-fall. For example, the otolith organs of the vestibular system no longer signal head tilt relative to gravity when standing. However, they can still sense head translation during body motion. Ambiguities and changes in how the gravitational input is processed can lead to potential errors in perception, which affects spatial orientation and mental representation. Dysfunctions of the vestibular system are common during and immediately after spaceflight, such as space motion sickness in orbit and balance disorders after return to Earth.

Adaptation to weightlessness involves not just the Sensory-motor coupling functions, but some autonomic nervous system functions as well. Sleep disorders and orthostatic intolerance are also common during and after spaceflight. There is no hydrostatic pressure in a weightless environment. As a result, the redistribution of body fluids toward the upper body causes a decrease in leg volume, which may affect muscle viscosity and compliance. An increase in intracranial pressure may also be responsible for a decrease in near visual acuity. In addition, muscle mass and strength both decrease as a result of the reduced loading in weightlessness. Moreover, approximately 70% of astronauts experience space motion sickness to some degree during the first days. The drugs commonly used to combat motion sickness, such as scopolamine and promethazine, have soporific effects. These factors can lead to chronic fatigue. The challenge of integrative space medicine and physiology is to investigate the adaptation of the human body to spaceflight as a whole, and not just as the sum of body parts because all body functions are connected and interact with each other.

== History of space neuroscience ==
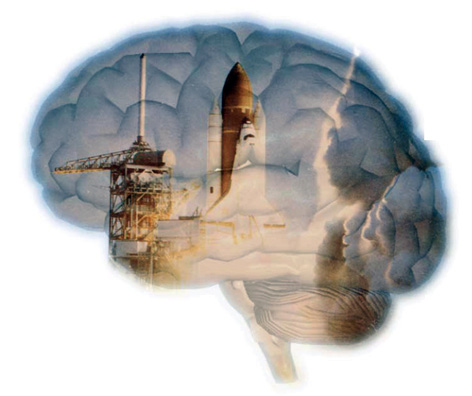
Space neuroscience is the scientific study of central nervous system functions during and after human spaceflight.

To date, only three countries, the United States, Russia, and China, have the capability to launch humans into orbit. However, 520 astronauts from more than thirty countries have flown in space and many of them have participated in space neuroscience research. The launch of the first living animal in orbit on Sputnik on November 3, 1957 marked the beginning of a rich history of unique scientific and technological achievements in space life sciences that have spanned more than fifty years to date.

The first documented space neuroscience experiments were performed during the third human mission on board the Russian Vostok spacecraft. These experiments began after the crew from previous missions complained from nausea and spatial disorientation in weightlessness. Space neuroscience experiments typically addressed these operational issues until the Skylab and Salyut space stations were made available for more fundamental research on the effect of gravity on CNS functions. Approximately 400 space neuroscience experiments have been performed from Vostok-3 in August 1962 to the Expedition-15 on board the International Space Station in October 2007.

== Operational aspects ==
Sensory and sensorimotor disturbances when arriving in low Earth orbit are well documented, the most known of these being space motion sickness (SMS). Individual differences, spacecraft size, and body movements cause SMS symptoms. Typically lasting the first three or four days of weightlessness, symptoms range from headaches and fatigue to nausea and vomiting. The consequences vary from simple discomfort to possible incapacitation, creating potential problems during extra-vehicular activity, re-entry, and emergency egress from the spacecraft. The body receives a variety of conflicting signals from the visual, somato-sensory, and vestibular organs in weightlessness. These conflicting inputs are thought to be the primary cause of SMS, but the precise mechanisms of the conflict are not well understood. Medications currently used to alleviate the symptoms produce undesirable side effects.

Astronauts must remain alert and vigilant while operating complicated equipment. Therefore, getting enough sleep is a crucial factor of mission success. Weightlessness, a confined and isolated environment, and busy schedules coupled with the absence of a regular 24-hour day make sleep difficult in space. Astronauts typically average only about six hours of sleep each night. Cumulative sleep loss and sleep disruption could lead to performance errors and accidents that pose significant risk to mission success. Sleep and circadian cycles also temporally modulate a broad range of physiological, hormonal, behavioral, and cognitive functions.

Methods to prevent sleep loss, reduce human error, and optimize mental and physical performance during long-duration spaceflight are being investigated. Particular concerns include the effect of the space environment on higher-order cognitive processes like decision-making and the impact of changing gravity on mental functions, which will be important if artificial gravity is considered as a countermeasure for future interplanetary space missions. It is also necessary to develop human-response measurement technologies to assess the crew's ability to perform flight-management tasks effectively. Simple and reliable behavioral and psycho-physiological response measurement systems are needed to assess mental loading, stress, task engagement, and situation awareness during spaceflight.

== Sensory functions in space ==
All living organisms on Earth have the ability to sense and respond to changes in their internal and external environment. Organisms, including humans, must accurately sense before they can react, thus ensuring survival. The body senses the environment by specialized sensory organs. The CNS utilizes these sensations in order to coordinate and organize muscle activities, shift from uncomfortable positions, and adjust balance properly. In common speech, five senses are usually recognized: vision, hearing, smell, taste, and touch. All these senses are somewhat affected by weightlessness.

In fact, the human body has seven sensory systems – not five. The sixth and seventh systems are the senses of motion located in the inner ear. The former signals the beginning and end of rotation and the latter signals body tilt relative to gravity as well as body translation. The seventh system no longer provides tilt information in weightlessness; however, it does continue to signal translation, so the afferent signals to the CNS are confusing. The experience of living and working in space alters the way the CNS interprets the otolith organ signals during linear acceleration. Although the perception is fairly accurate when subjects are exposed to angular acceleration in yaw in-flight, there are disturbances during angular rotation in pitch and roll, and during linear acceleration along the body transversal and longitudinal axes. Perception of body motion is also altered during the same motion immediately after landing. There is an adaptation to weightlessness in orbit that carries over to post-flight reactions to linear acceleration.

== Posture, movement, and locomotions ==
Exposure to weightlessness causes changes to the signals from the receptors to touch, pressure, and gravity, i.e., all information necessary for postural stability. Adaptive modifications in the central processing of sensory information take place to produce motor responses that are appropriate for the new gravitational environment. As a result, terrestrial motor strategies are progressively abandoned in weightlessness, as astronauts adapt to the weightless environment. This is particularly true for the major postural muscles found in the lower legs. The modifications in posture, movement, and locomotion acquired in reduced gravity are then inappropriate for Earth's gravity upon return. After landing, postural instability approaching clinical ataxia is manifested as a result of this in-flight neural reorganization.

Difficulties with standing, walking, turning corners, climbing stairs, and a slowing of gait are experienced as astronauts re-adapt to Earth's gravity, until terrestrial motor strategies are fully re-acquired. Adaptation to spaceflight also induces a significant increase in the time required to traverse an obstacle course on landing day, and recovery of functional mobility takes an average of two weeks. These difficulties can have adverse consequences for an astronauts’ ability to stand up or escape from the vehicle during emergencies and to function effectively immediately after leaving the spacecraft after flight. Thus it is important to understand the cause of these profound impairments of posture and locomotion stability, and develop countermeasures.

The most significant sensorimotor problems astronauts will face during a stay on the Moon and Mars are likely to occur when walking around in their space suits. The suits are big and bulky and change the body's center of gravity. This along with the uneven terrain and limited field of view makes locomotion challenging.

== Compensatory eye movements ==
The function of the vestibular system during spaceflight is by far the most carefully studied of all. This is especially true of the gravity-sensing otolith organs and their relationship to eye movements. The vestibular semicircular canal function seems unchanged in weightlessness because the horizontal eye movements that compensated for head yaw rotation are not affected by spaceflight. The absence of gravity stimulation of the otoliths reduces the torsional vestibulo-ocular reflex during head roll rotation in microgravity. This deficit is absent when astronauts are exposed to centrifugal forces, suggesting that the adaptive CNS changes are taking place centrally rather than peripherally.

During the first days in orbit, the asymmetry of vertical eye movements in response to moving visual scenes is inverted. A return to symmetry of the vestibulo-ocular and optokinetic reflexes is then observed. Some studies have shown increased latencies and decreased peak velocities of saccades, while others have found just the opposite. It is possible that these conflicting results depend on when the measures were obtained during the mission. There is also a serious disruption of smooth pursuit eye movements, especially in the vertical plane.

Human missions to Mars will include several transitions between different gravitational environments. These changes will eventually affect the reflex eye movements. A key question is whether astronauts can have different sets of reflexes among which they can rapidly switch based on the gravitational environment. Determination of the dual-adaptive capabilities of reflex eye movements in such circumstances is vitally important so that it can be determined to what extent the Sensory-motor coupling skills acquired in one-g environment will transfer to others.

== Spatial orientation ==
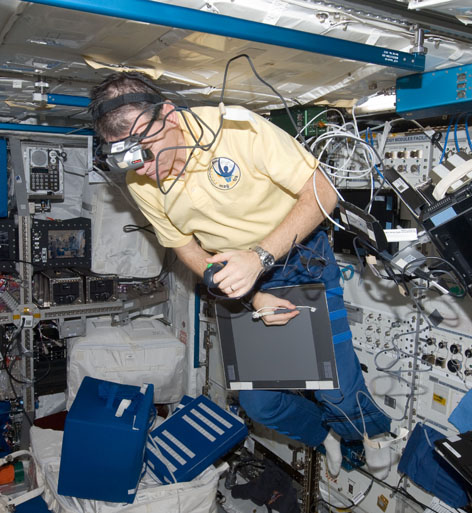
An astronaut on board the International Space Station is wearing a head-mounted display for performing a space neuroscience experiment aimed at evaluating changes in perceived depth and distance.

In weightlessness, astronauts must rely much more on vision to maintain their spatial orientation, because the otolith organs can no longer signal the “down” direction. During prolonged exposure, however, reliance seems to shift toward an intrinsic, body vertical reference. The erroneous illusions of self-motion during head movements performed during and after return to Earth gravity are presumably due to a re-interpretation of vestibular inputs. Ground-based studies suggest that the CNS resolves the “tilt-translation” ambiguity based on the frequency content of the linear acceleration detected by the otolith organs, with low frequency indicating “tilt” and high frequency indicating “translation”. A crossover exists at about 0.3 Hz where the otolith signals are then ambiguous. Exposure to weightlessness presumably results in a shift of this crossover frequency, which could then contribute to spatial disorientation and SMS.

Although investigations of higher cognitive processes, such as navigation and mental rotation are limited, the astronauts frequently report that the spacecraft interiors look longer and higher than they actually are, and a reduction in the perceived height of three-dimensional objects is observed in-flight compared with pre-flight, suggesting an alteration in the mental representation of three-dimensional cues in weightlessness. Perception is a model of the brain, a hypothesis about the world that presupposes the Newton's laws of motion. These laws change in weightlessness and, therefore, one could expect changes in the mental representation of objects’ shape and distance during spaceflight. The rare investigations carried out in space so far have not demonstrated drastic changes, probably because the CNS continues to use an internal model of gravity, at least for a short while. It can be speculated that the way of processing three dimensions will be more developed after a long absence of a gravitational reference.

Further investigations carried out in space will perhaps reveal that other higher cortical functions are impaired in weightless conditions. The combination of virtual reality with the measurement of evoked potentials and brain mapping on board the International Space Station should provide exciting results on the adaptive mechanisms of cerebral functions in weightlessness.

== Neuroscience and space exploration ==
From Voskhod to the International Space Station, spacecraft have improved in size and comfort and have allowed more and more people traveling into orbit. However, even with all of the human spaceflight experience gained over the past fifty years, no single completely effective countermeasure, or combination of countermeasures, exists against the negative effects of long-duration exposure to weightlessness. If a crew of astronauts were to embark on a six-month journey to Mars today, the countermeasures currently employed would presumably leave them less operational after landing.

Many believe that physiological adaptation to Mars gravity (0.38 G) and re-adaptation to Earth gravity (1 G) would be enhanced by frequent exposure to artificial gravity on board the spacecraft en route to and from Mars. This would require an on-board human-rated centrifuge or spacecraft rotation to produce a centrifugal force similar to gravity. This solution, while potentially effective, raises a number of operational, engineering, and physiological issues that will need to be addressed. The human physiological responses to long-duration exposure to anything other than zero-gravity or Earth's gravity are unknown. Research is needed to identify the minimum level, duration, and frequency of gravity level required to maintain normal CNS functions, as well as the importance of a gravity gradient across the body.

The complex functioning of the CNS, even in the 1-G environment of Earth, has not revealed all its secrets. The most basic space neuroscience questions must be answered to minimize risks and optimize crew performance during transit and planetary operations. The results of this research will certainly find other applications in medicine and biotechnology. Our ability to understand how Earth's gravitational environment has shaped the evolution of sensory and motor systems can give us a clearer understanding of the fundamental mechanisms of CNS functions. Knowledge of the effects of gravity on CNS functions in humans, as well as elucidation of the basic mechanisms by which these effects occur, will be of direct benefit to understanding the impact of, and providing countermeasures for, long-term exposure of humans to the weightlessness of spaceflight and the partial gravity of Moon and Mars bases.

== See also ==
- Effect of spaceflight on the human body
