= Modular Man (disambiguation) =

Modular Man is a Marvel Comics supervillain.

Modular Man can also refer to:

- Modular Man (America's Best Comics), a supervillain from America's Best Comics
- The Modular Man, a 1992 novel by Roger Macbride Allen
- Modular man, also referred to as Le Modulor, an anthropometric scale of proportions devised by the Swiss-born French architect Le Corbusier
- Modular Man, a concept used by social anthropologist Ernest Gellner in his Conditions of Liberty (1994)
