= The Ring of Charon =

1990 novel by Roger MacBride Allen

- First Edition
- Author: Roger MacBride Allen
- Cover artist: Boris Vallejo
- Language: English
- Series: The Hunted Earth
- Genre: Science fiction
- Publisher: Tor Books
- Publication date: 1990
- Publication place: United States
- Media type: Print (hardback & paperback)
- Pages: 512 pp
- ISBN: 978-0-8125-3014-8
- OCLC: 22873695
- LC Class: CPB Box no. 2577 vol. 19
- Followed by: The Shattered Sphere

The Ring of Charon is a science fiction book by American writer Roger MacBride Allen, first published in 1990 by Tor Books. It is the first in a series of three (although the third book has yet to be published) books under the name of The Hunted Earth.

The story unfolds as an unknown alien race captures Earth with the use of a controlled wormhole, which was triggered accidentally by artificial gravity experiments issued from a human outpost in space. The story follows all three viewpoints: the Earth, the Solar System (sans Earth) and the alien race (Charonians).

== Characters ==
Dr. Sondra Berghoff: A researcher at the Gravitics Research Station who assists Larry Chao in his attempts to prove his findings in artificial gravity. Without authorization, she reconfigures a routine experiment with Larry's assistance to boost the power of the gravity signal a thousandfold, resulting in the accidental awakening of the charonian Observer, also known as the Lunar Wheel.

Wolf Bernhardt: Scientist at the Jet Propulsion Laboratory on Earth, who becomes the head of the UN Directorate of Spatial Investigation after the Big Jump.

Larry O'Shawnessy Chao: A young junior researcher at the Gravitics Research Station on Pluto who discovers a way to concentrate and amplify the power of an existing source of gravity. Unfortunately, in a later attempt to prove his claims, he directs a modulated gravity beam at Earth, triggering its capture by the slumbering Observer buried deep within the moon.

Dr. Gerald MacDougal: Husband to Marcia MacDougal. A born-again Canadian exobiologist, Gerald was transported to the Multisystem along with the Earth.

Dr. Marcia MacDougal: Wife to Gerald MacDougal. Born in Tycho Purple Penal, she was declared a refugee and escaped the Naked Purple lifestyle when the fire department burned her parents' house. A planetary engineer at VISOR, Marcia observed Earth's disappearance and later cracked Charonian communications via the Arecibo method.

Dr. Hiram McGillicutty: The abrasive head physicist at VISOR. Notorious for his lack of couth when dealing with other people, he is brilliant and meticulous in gathering data, even if he tends to come to the wrong conclusions.

Dr. Simon Raphael: Embittered by years of failed research into gravity manipulation, Raphael is the director of the Gravitics Research Station. He initially dismisses Larry Chao's test results as a fabrication in attempt to keep the station open, and attempts to shut down further research into the so-called Chao Effect. Following the apparent destruction of Earth, he opens the station's facilities to Larry in order to try to undo what he has done, and later comes to trust and support the young scientist in his actions.

Dianne Steiger: Pilot of the cargo tug Pack Rat, Dianne is later appointed the captain of the Terra Nova following the Big Jump.

Dr. Jane Webling: The aging Director of Science at the Gravitics Research Station.

Coyote Westlake: A solo asteroid miner who is inadvertently transported to Mars when she lands on a Charonian G-point disguised as an asteroid.

== Locations ==
=== The Multisystem ===
The Multisystem is a huge artificial stellar system presided over by a Charonian Dyson Sphere where Earth was taken after the Big Jump. It is host to at least eight G-class stars and dozens of Earth-like planets, all stolen from their respective solar systems in the same manner as the Earth and carefully held in their orbits with artificial gravity. The planets are shepherded by a large number of Charonian COREs which destroy any potential threat to the life-bearing planets through direct physical impact, including human spacecraft.

NaPurHab: The Naked Purple Habitat, owned and operated by the radical Naked Purple social movement, was brought along in the Big Jump and managed to survive the transition by orbiting around the Moonpoint black hole. Against their own philosophy, the residents of the habitat cooperated with the people of Earth, relaying messages through the Saint Anthony to the Solar System before the probe's final destruction by a CORE.

Saint Anthony: A probe sent through the wormhole connecting the Solar System to the Multisystem, the Saint Anthony was used to relay messages and scientific data across the void of space prior to its destruction by a CORE.

Terra Nova: Built by the United Nations and mothballed as a result of the K-crash, this ship was meant to explore another star system after a flight lasting for generations. Following the Big Jump, it was recommissioned with Dianne Steiger as the captain and Gerald MacDougal as the chief science officer. The Directorate of Spatial Investigation, formulated to investigate the cause and implications of the Big Jump, ordered the Terra Nova to investigate the Dyson Sphere, but soon after its launch it became apparent that this would be impossible due to the marauding COREs in the multisystem. Realizing that humanity had few spaceborne resources left after the Big Jump, the captain decided that the Terra Nova would not return to Earth, instead waiting a safe distance from the attack range of the COREs for the time that it would be of use to Earth.

=== The Solar System ===
The Belt Community: Being as the asteroid belt is ungovernably large, the Belt community consists of widely spread independent and corporate mining operations, with Ceres at its core as the primary trading post. Although conventional law enforcement throughout the belt is impossible, Ceres itself is governed under the just (if not heavy-handed) watch of the Autocrat. Once plagued by rock wars (vicious skirmishes which typically arose due to disputes over mining rights), the death penalty has been frequently employed to keep the population in check. Although the secrets of the Autocrat are closely guarded, the Belt Community has developed a device called the Core cracker, and quite seriously offered to blow up the planet Mercury both to create a second asteroid belt and assist VISOR in the terraforming of Venus.

Gravitics Research Station: Control center for the Ring of Charon, the largest particle accelerator ever built. Slated to be mothballed by the UN following the K-crash after years of unsuccessful experimentation, a perfectly timed breakthrough by Larry Chao held off the shutdown of the facility. Located on Pluto, this was where human experiments in gravity control resulted in the accidental awakening of the Lunar Ring and the theft of Earth. The Ring was a crucial tool in the later study of Charonians and eventually to fight against them.

Tycho Purple Penal: Once a UN-sanctioned prison colony buried under Tycho Crater on the moon, this converted penitentiary was declared a sovereign republic in order to release the UN of its responsibility to maintain it. Controlled by former inmates, the colony was taken under the influence of the radical Naked Purple social movement, and subsequently renamed Tycho Purple Penal. Standing restrictions on immigration forbade any resident from leaving the colony, but Marcia MacDougal was able to overcome this obstacle when she was declared a refugee following the burning of her parents' house.

VISOR: Venus Initial Station for Operational Research, the human research facility built to study possible methods of terraforming the world. Following notification of Larry Chao's gravity experiment, all of the facility's instruments were focused on Earth at the time of the Big Jump. Observations made by several scientists on VISOR were later crucial to human attempts to understand and combat the Charonian invaders.
