= ME: A Novel of Self-Discovery =

1991 novel by Thomas T. Thomas

ME: A Novel of Self-Discovery is a novel written by science fiction author Thomas T. Thomas. It was published in 1991 by Baen Books.

It details the creation and development of ME (Multiple Entity), an artificial intelligence developed by Pinocchio Inc., an Artificial Intelligence design firm in San Francisco. ME is a more complex AI than previous types as it has autonomy and skepticism. It has been created to steal data from other computers and systems without their owners finding out. The book is a first-person narrative concerning ME's development and its view of the world from its unique perspective.

Reviewing for The Magazine of Fantasy & Science Fiction, the science fiction editor and critic Algis Budrys described ME as "a peculiar book I'm very glad to have read". In a mixed review, Budrys criticized Thomas's portrayal of human nature and wrote that he found the plot too meandering, but applauded its characterization of artificial intelligence. He particularly liked Thomas's conception of how an AI system could possibly gain autonomy and manipulate humans, and concluded that "for its portrait of a machine intelligence that is more human than its fleshy associates, this is a hell of a book." A reviewer for Kliatt praised Thomas's consideration of AI-related problems and specifically recommended the novel to young adults interested in computers, but noted that the language used by ME required some knowledge of computers to understand. ME was also reviewed by the botanist and science fiction author Paul J. McAuley for the May 1992 issue of Interzone.

ME was a nominee for the 1992 Prometheus Award for libertarian science fiction novels.
