= Farside Cannon =

1988 novel by Roger MacBride Allen

- First edition
- Author: Roger MacBride Allen
- Cover artist: Alan Gutierrez
- Language: English
- Genre: Science fiction
- Publisher: Baen Books
- Publication date: 1988
- Publication place: United States of America
- Media type: Print (Hardcover, Paperback)
- Pages: 406
- ISBN: 0-671-65428-4
- OCLC: 18356948

Farside Cannon is a science fiction novel by American writer Roger McBride Allen.

== Plot summary ==
Relations between Settlement Worlds and Earth is a constant source of tension. A geologist, Garrison Morrow, discovers himself in the middle of the two parties when a series of peculiar events occur, thus leading him deeper and deeper into the delicate balance of political powers on the Moon and the rest of the Solar System.
