= Crisis of Empire =

1989 novel by Roger MacBride Allen and David Drake

- Authors: David Drake, William C. Dietz, Roger Macbride Allen, Chelsea Quinn Yarbro
- Cover artist: Paul Alexander
- Language: English
- Series: Crisis of Empire
- Genre: Science fiction novel
- Publisher: Baen Books
- Publication date: November 1988 - January 1994
- Publication place: United States
- Media type: Print (paperback)
- OCLC: 20678625

Crisis of Empire is a 1988 military science fiction tetralogy by David Drake and four co-authors, comprising:

- An Honorable Defense: Crisis of Empire I (with Thomas T. Thomas, November 1988)
- Cluster Command: Crisis of Empire II (with William C. Dietz, May 1989)
- The War Machine: Crisis of Empire III (with Roger Macbride Allen, November 1989)
- Crown of Empire: Crisis of Empire IV (with Chelsea Quinn Yarbro, January 1994)

All four volumes' cover were illustrated by Paul Alexander.

== Setting ==
The series is a modern take on Golden Age space opera, set in the year 5341 of the Pact (equivalent to 9095 CE.) The titular Empire is the Pact, an interstellar polity of four thousand worlds, founded and dominated by humans but incorporating many "signatory" alien species, who are ineligible for citizenship and relegated to menial occupations despite comprising the vast majority of its population.

Nominally a republic, the Pact is in practice a semi-hereditary constitutional monarchy modeled on the Roman Principate. It structure is Byzantine and oligarchic: it is divided into autonomous Clusters, whose aristocratic governors (who are simultaneously also senators and electors) balance the interests of bureaucracies, the local and central branches of the Pact military, mercantile interests, and the powerful Kona Tatsu ("Iron Dust") secret police.

The series' titular crisis is precipitated by the sudden assassination of the Pact's head of state (officially merely the "Hereditary High Secretary to the Pact Council In Absentia"), triggering local crises in individual Clusters as well as a Pact-level scramble for power between the supporters of the Secretary's legitimate heir (a minor) and those vying for power themselves.

== An Honorable Defense ==
The book alternates between several narrators, but is mainly told from the point of view of Taddeuz Bertingas, a senior communications bureaucrat in the Aurora Cluster, a Pact province with thirty inhabited planets. The Auroran governor Deirdre Sallee intends to remain loyal to the legitimate succession, while other, more ambitious governors are considering their own bids for the High Secretaryship. The normally apolitical Bertingas finds himself drawn into a vortex of palace intrigue; after surviving an assassination attempt, he joins the loyalist faction, which already includes his acquaintance Halan Follard, the local head of the Pact's Kona Tatsu secret police, Mora Koskiusko, the daughter of the commander of Gemini, the local Pact naval base, and the resourceful mercenary Patty Firkin. A surprise attack on Gemini by a huge fleet of improvised warships converted from freighters leads to the discovery that the Haiken Maru mercantile conglomerate is conspiring with Aaron Spile, the ambitious governor of neighboring Arachne Cluster. After several additional attempts on his life, Bertingas takes control of the Communications Department militia, a force of non-humans originally recruited as cheap cannon-fodder by the conspirators, and gains their loyalty with a promise to advance the cause of non-human equality. He leads the militia in a successful ground assault on Batavia, the Haiken Maru's fortified planetary base and shipyard. Governor Spile's armada arrives in Aurora Cluster and lays siege to Gemini base a second time, precipitating a major battle in which the Arachne forces are defeated by a revolt of the non-humans aboard their ships and Spile himself is captured. A second fleet arrives under the command of Anson Merikur (the main character of the following volume), who introduces himself as the acting governor of Harmony Cluster and proposes that governor Sallee join his expedition to Earth, where they will ensure the succession of the High Secretary's legitimate heir.

== Cluster Command ==
The events of the volume occur more-or-less concurrently with the preceding one, beginning with Merikur being promoted to general and given command of Pact forces in the Harmony Cluster. He travels there in the company of its newly-named governor, senator Anthony Windsor, who is distrusted by conservatives for his radical advocacy of full equality for non-humans. Merikur finds himself forced into a political marriage with Windsor's niece, Bethany, a union that is initially loveless but slowly leads to genuine feeling for one another.

The Harmony Cluster turns out to have its own problematic Haiken Maru situation, involving an open rebellion in the mines of the brutal jungle planet of Teller. The local Haiken Maru executive, Nola Rankoo, immediately tries to have Windsor assassinated, but he survives and dispatches Merikur and his Cernian alien advisor, Eitor Senda, to pacify Teller, where a coalition of human and Cernian rebels are receiving support from outside the Pact: the Cernian Confederation. Senda discovers that a Cernian political faction has made a secret deal with Haiken Maru to draw the planet out of the Pact; Merikur exposes this fact, ending the brutal corporate regime and bringing the rebels over to his side. Teller is shortly invaded by a combined Cernian-Haiken Maru force.

== The War Machine ==
The third novel follows a Pact naval officer, captain Allison Spencer, who is dispatched with a fleet of ships to the Daltgeld system, where he encounters an unknown enemy that threatens the whole galaxy. After being forcibly divorced from his wife for political reasons, Spencer tries to force his way on board the ship she's on. After being ejected, he gets drunk and implanted with a "feelgood" device that stimulates the pleasure centers of the brain. Spencer is saved from this addictive and lethal fate by an unknown Kona Tatsu (secret police) agent. They clean and care for him, then send him on a mission to the Daltgeld system.

Working with Agent Suss Nanahbuc, Spencer is given command of a task force and told that Kona Tatsu (KT) agents are disappearing from the planet. Upon arrival, the Duncan splashes down to dock for repairs, and Nanahbuc heads out to learn the fate of the other agents.

While docked, Spencer gets a visit from McCain, a KT agent hiding from the enemy. However, the enemy is aboard and kills McCain before they can analyze the data she found. The enemy turns out to be a small mercury-like blob that seems to react to its environment, weighs 16 tons, and can control the devices it infects. Spencer leaves the ship and closes it down tight, but it’s already too late.

In the end, it turns out an alien artifact was recently discovered in an asteroid, and the captain of the mining freighter was "convinced" to take the artifact to the head of a local conglomerate, Jameson. The device, a helmet made of a mercury-like substance, takes over Jameson and uses him as a control center for taking over the system, with plans to leave it and spread throughout the galaxy. After losing his flagship to prevent an alien from leaving the system, Spencer and Nanahbuc locate the main asteroid of the enemy and head in with the task force to put an end to it for good.

== Release details ==
- 1988, U.S., Baen, ISBN 0-671-69789-7, November 1988, Paperback
- 1989, U.S., Baen, ISBN 0-671-69817-6, May 1989, Paperback
- 1989, U.S., Baen, ISBN 0-671-69845-1, November 1989, Paperback
- 1994, U.S., Baen, ISBN 0-671-72208-5, January 1994, Paperback

== Reviews ==
- Review by Scott Winnett (October 1989) in Locus #345
