= The Mask of Loki =

1990 epic science fantasy novel by Roger Zelazny and Thomas T. Thomas

- Dust-jacket illustration from the first edition
- Author: Roger Zelazny and Thomas T. Thomas
- Cover artist: Gary Ruddell
- Language: English
- Genre: Science fantasy
- Publisher: Baen
- Publication date: November 1990
- Publication place: United States
- Media type: Print (Hardback)
- Pages: 340 pp
- ISBN: 0-671-72021-X

The Mask of Loki (1990) is an epic science fantasy novel by American writers Roger Zelazny and Thomas T. Thomas, chronicling a centuries-long struggle between the avatars of Loki and Ahriman.
