= First Citizen (novel) =

1987 novel by Thomas Thurston Thomas

- Author: Thomas Thurston Thomas
- Language: English
- Subject: science fiction alternative history
- Publisher: Baen; First Edition
- Publication date: December 1, 1987 (paperback)
- Publication place: United States
- Media type: Paperback
- Pages: 373 (paperback)
- ISBN: 0671653687 (paperback)
- OCLC: 17308403
- LC Class: CPB Box no. 2654 vol. 12

First Citizen is a science fiction book written by Thomas Thurston Thomas and published on December 1, 1987. The book is loosely based on the life and times of Julius Caesar.

== Plot ==
First Citizen explores the alternative history story of Granville James Corbin, or “Granny” to his friends and enemies, as he "grows up in the chaos caused by the decision of the American Government to repudiate the National Debt". The country becomes privatized, the military is largely replaced by mercenaries and privately raised armies, and, after Washington, DC, is destroyed with a nuclear weapon, the Speaker of the House becomes dictator of the United States.

During this time, Corbin achieves success in various businesses, a privately raised military force, and, eventually, into the federal government. The author matches Corbin's career to Caesar’s career. Eventually, Corbin and his allies argue and the Second Civil War begins. Corbin's victory is followed by his assassination.

== Reviews ==
One reviewer said, "Overall, First Citizen is a good piece of speculative fiction and well worth a read."
