= The Shattered Sphere =

1995 novel by Roger MacBride Allen

- First Edition
- Author: Roger MacBride Allen
- Cover artist: Boris Vallejo
- Language: English
- Series: The Hunted Earth
- Genre: Science fiction
- Publisher: Tor Books
- Publication date: 1995
- Publication place: United States
- Media type: Print (hardback & paperback)
- Pages: 491 pp
- ISBN: 978-0-8125-3016-2
- OCLC: 33093807
- Preceded by: The Ring of Charon
- Followed by: The Falling World (announced)

The Shattered Sphere is a science fiction book by the author Roger MacBride Allen. It is the second of The Hunted Earth series, preceded by The Ring of Charon.
