= Flare (novel) =

1992 novel by Roger Zelazny and Thomas Thurston Thomas

- Cover illustration from the first edition
- Author: Roger Zelazny and Thomas Thurston Thomas
- Cover artist: Dean Morrissey
- Language: English
- Genre: Science fiction
- Publisher: Baen Books
- Publication date: September 1992
- Publication place: United States
- Media type: Print (paperback)
- Pages: 344
- ISBN: 0-671-72133-X
- OCLC: 26429687

Flare is a science fiction novel by American writers Roger Zelazny and Thomas Thurston Thomas, published in 1992.

The novel envisions Earth in the year 2081 and explores the harmful impact that a solar flare could have on a future interplanetary civilization after nearly a century of solar inactivity.

The book takes a scientific approach to its concept, offering almost no traditional narrative. Instead, it is composed of short segments depicting people in various locations suffering from the effects of the solar flare.
