= Orphan of Creation =

1988 book by Roger MacBride Allen

- Author: Roger MacBride Allen
- Genre: Science Fiction
- Published: 1988
- Publication place: US
- ISBN: 0-9671783-3-9

Orphan of Creation is a 1988 science fiction novel by American author Roger MacBride Allen. The book was nominated for the Philip K. Dick Award in 1989.

== Synopsis ==
Anthropologists discover a remnant of ancestral genus Australopithecus; creatures enslaved by an African village that are shunned by its neighbors for its cruel practices.

The protagonist is a paleoanthropologist who finds an odd anecdote about imported apes in her great-great-grandfather's account of growing up a slave in Mississippi. This discovery piques her curiosity, prompting her to make a small-scale excavation of ape bones. What she finds instead are several complete skeletons of australopithecines buried in the 1850s. The first section is about her and her colleagues assessing the implications while they try to keep the discovery a secret, interspersed with bits from the point of view of an Australopithecus kept as a slave in an isolated village. In the second and third sections, the paleontologist makes an expedition to Africa to look for living Australopithecus, ultimately resulting in contact with the Australopithecus.

== Plot ==
The novel is presented in three basic parts:

=== Part one ===
Introduces the protagonist, paleoanthropologist Dr. Barbara Marchando, her African-American family history and her heritage. Marchando is visiting her family during Thanksgiving, recovering from a recent, bitter divorce, prompting her to seek time alone to explore an attic. She discovers her ancestor Zebulon's diary which yields an account of the arrival of strange, new animal slaves dying from disease soon after arriving and provides motivation for digging on the grounds of the family's former plantation home. The dig is originally intended to identify the approximate location of a rumored pre-Civil War slave graveyard. A large section of the graveyard is found. A smaller separate section of graves yields skeletal remains that all display the same cranial and other bodily disfigurements. To the Dr.'s trained eye they resemble skulls known in fossil records as Australopithecus, a human ancestral species that died out some 1,400,000 years before. However, these remains are at most two centuries old. They are classified as an example of the subspecies Australopithecus boisei. The skeletons' classification and confirmed recent dates of death are impossible according to the accepted fossil record. Despite attempts to maintain a low profile, word of the unexpected findings leak to media. Skeptics express disbelief and ridicule the doctor's conclusions, jeopardizing her reputation and career.

=== Part two ===
Research of old town records disclose the sale of a new, heartier type of slave to the former plantation's master. The vessel bringing the 'new type slave' cargo is listed by name through the shipment manifest and its port of origin in Africa is identified. Marchando wins funding to visit the African port city and search for traces of what might have been a small enclave of humans displaying traits of an early human ancestor. After several unsuccessful excursions, a promising lead at last points to a remote, isolated and unfriendly group of villagers as a source of 'worker beasts'. A translator, armed escort, Marchando and several companions make plans to visit the isolated group. Marchando and the translator question the chief about stories of white men coming long ago to buy 'worker beasts' from the village and if they might help find where such 'beasts' lived. After an agreement for information is arranged, a young, dirty, naked and malnourished Australopithecus boisei female is led by collar and leash into the hut and handed over as purchased property. Aghast, Marchando realizes she has unintentionally traded a few goods and tools for a living fossil. The chief advises that the trade is fair and that most of the village has at least one beast to perform work they avoid. As the translator explains that undoing the exchange with the chief would prove insulting & dangerous, Marchando and her team leave with the nervous, but otherwise docile female. The doctor and team set about making plans to return to the port city and sedate the female while arrangements are made to transition her to Europe and eventually the United States. The female Boisei is given the name "Thursday" by Marchando. This is both a reference to the day she was found, and is a literary reference to the character of Friday in Robinson Crusoe.

=== Part three ===
Despite efforts to maintain secrecy, word leaks. Upon reaching a research hospital facility outside Washington, D.C., and publication of the find, the shock to the scientific community and general public is intense. Marchando and other researchers are successful in teaching Thursday to communicate by sign language. Thursday is soon found capable of reasoning, compassion and understanding abstract ideas like time and family; far beyond any ape's cognition. The question arises, "what is Thursday"? She obviously is not a Homo sapiens nor an ape (Hominidae). Genetic testing reveals she is partly hybrid from past interbreeding of her ancestors and human captors, further confusing her status as a species. Conflicting ideas on her rights emerge. They're seen variously as better substitutes for chimpanzees in medical testing, an easily trained labor force, potentially living organ banks, essentially a future slave race to be considered as beasts or property. Other research centers begin plans to obtain more boisei from Africa, as specimens for study and zoos. As a descendant herself of slaves, Marchando finds this unthinkable. Authorities begin efforts to access and control Thursday in the "interest of science", endangering her safety and life. Marchando is desperate to protect Thursday and prove she should be treated as human. She tracks Thursday's ovulation and secretly conducts an artificial insemination using sperm frozen years ago by her ex-husband. When Thursday becomes several months pregnant, she ignites a legal and moral firestorm over whether to permit her pregnancy to come full term. Before a legal decision can be reached, Thursday births a healthy, mixed female child resembling both herself and a human biological father, thus demonstrating Thursday's full genetic compatibility with modern humanity.

The novel draws parallels between the conventional thinking of centuries ago that humans from Africa were not truly human beings worthy of rights. The novel's ending is left open for interpretation on what it means to be human and where a line, if any, can be drawn between ourselves and our ancestors.

== Critical reviews and reader popularity ==
While the novel was well received by critics such as Locus Magazine and cited for attention to scientific details, it did not reach a broad audience. It has lately been re-discovered, gaining more of a following among readers as discoveries of, as then unknown, subspecies of humanity have come to light since 1988; particularly the discovery of the 'Hobbit' Homo floresiensis, and Denisova Hominins. New paperback editions were produced in both 2000, 2010 and an audio book version became available in 2016.

== Societal, historical and biological commentary ==
The story of Thursday's life and her species, their thoughts, their treatment, emotions and intelligence is at first presented without a context of time, era or location. Indeed the first passages devoted to Thursday's point of view and thoughts are easily taken as perhaps a young African girl introduced to the hardships of life on a plantation in the American South during the early 1800s. The hardships endured by Thursday, beatings, foul food & water, cold nights spent sleeping outdoors and separation from family members are direct parallels to the Treatment of slaves in the United States before the American Civil War. It is only later in the novel that Thursday is revealed to be living in modern day Africa and is treated as nothing but property and an in-human beast by her village owners. She recognizes kindness in Dr. Marchando and while uneasy and scared, learns to trust this new human in her life. Once introduced to sign language and encouraged to communicate, learn and interact with humans as more than animal awakens thoughts of self identify in Thursday. The potential to becoming a person only needing a spark. Again, paralleling the pre-Civil War thinking that slaves were something less than human and incapable of actual intelligence; while also banning the education of slaves to read or write.

Within Dr. Marchando's own story are her struggles with history and the accounts of how otherwise civilized people (slave owners) could treat fellow human beings. Marchando tires of explanations that masters didn't understand their actions, actually believing their slaves to be less than human. Most damning of all is the discovery of historical advertisements attempting to sell Thursday's ancestors as a "new type slave, which cannot be considered worthy of the protections by the Northern States". Showing that slave traders, owners and masters had full knowledge of their guilt and were desperate to find replacement workers if the practice of slavery is eventually abolished. Marchando recognizes the child like intelligence and compassion in Thursday and the prospect of the doctor inadvertently beginning a new era of slave ownership terrifies her.

Since the Book's publishing in 1988, numerous scientific discoveries have eschewed the once clear timeline of human evolution, development and lineage. A 2010 study strongly indicated that all humans of Eurasian descent have up to 4% Neanderthal DNA in their genetic makeup. Genetic testing on bone fragments have also shown Neanderthals to have inter-bred with Denisovans (another human Subspecies) and some modern humans (Papua New Guinea and Australian Aborigines) also show traces of ancient direct interbreeding with Denisovans. While both Neanderthals and Denisovans became extinct some 40,000 years ago, the 'Hobbit' Homo floresiensis may have survived until nearly 12,000 years ago (The dating of remains and tools is still contested). The book deals with a distant, archaic hominin in the form of Thursday's Australopithecus boisei which lived some 1,400,000 years ago. While the biology and genealogy of mankind was considered distinctly separate in 1988, evidence since then shows much of mankind shares at least some genetic Heridity from long gone cousin species. The intermix of genetic material between defined subspecies complicates what defines the title Human.
