= Thomas Thurston Thomas =

American novelist (born 1948)

Thomas Thurston Thomas (born 1948), also writing as Thomas T. Thomas and Thomas Wren, is primarily a science fiction author.

Thomas was born in Summit, New Jersey, in 1948. He attended Warren Area High School and graduated in 1966. He then attended Pennsylvania State University, graduating with honors in 1970 with a bachelor's degree in English literature.

== Books ==
- The Doomsday Effect (writing as Thomas Wren) (1986) Winner of the Compton Crook Award in 1987.
- First Citizen (1987)
- The Mask of Loki (1990) (with Roger Zelazny)
- Crygender (1991)
- ME: A Novel of Self-Discovery (1991)
- Flare (1992) (with Roger Zelazny)
- Mars Plus (1994) (with Frederik Pohl)
- Trojan Horse (2010) (published as ebook)
- Sunflowers (2010) (published as ebook)
- The Judge's Daughter (2011) (published as ebook and paperback) (general fiction)
- The Children of Possibility (2012) (published as ebook and paperback)
- The Professor's Mistress (2013) (published as ebook and paperback) (general fiction)
- Coming of Age (2014) (published as ebook and paperback in two volumes)
- ME, Too: Loose in the Network (2016) (published as ebook and paperback)
- The House at the Crossroads (2017) (published as ebook and paperback)
- Medea's Daughter (2018) (published as ebook and paperback)
- The Divina in the Troupe (2019) (published as ebook and paperback)
- Revolt on the Iron Planet (2022) (published as ebook and paperback)

He has also contributed one title, An Honorable Defense (1988), to the Crisis of Empire series (with David Drake), and the novelette "Hey Diddle Diddle" to the fifth installment of the Man-Kzin Wars series (based in the Known Space Universe of Larry Niven).
