= Roger MacBride Allen =

American science fiction author (born 1957)

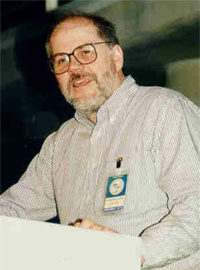
- Born: September 26, 1957 (age 68); Bridgeport, Connecticut, U.S.
- Education: Boston University
- Occupation: Author
- Spouse: Eleanore Fox
- Children: 2
- Website: www.rogermacbrideallen.com

Roger MacBride Allen (born September 26, 1957) is an American science fiction author. He was born in Bridgeport, Connecticut, and grew up outside of Washington, D.C., graduating from Walt Whitman High School. He graduated from Boston University in 1979. His father was American historian and author Thomas B. Allen.

== Background ==
Allen's family moved to Bethesda, Maryland, in 1966, when he was nine years old. He earned a degree in journalism from Boston University, after-which he returned to suburban Washington DC.

== Works ==
=== Allies and Aliens ===
- Allies and Aliens (1995) collects The Torch of Honor and Rogue Powers
  - The Torch of Honor (1985)
  - Rogue Powers (1986)

=== Hunted Earth ===
- The Ring of Charon (1990)
- The Shattered Sphere (1994)
- The Falling World (TBA)

=== Caliban ===
- Isaac Asimov's Caliban (1993)
- Isaac Asimov's Inferno (1994)
- Isaac Asimov's Utopia (1996)

=== Chronicles of Solace ===
- The Depths of Time (2000)
- The Ocean of Years (2002)
- The Shores of Tomorrow (2003)

=== BSI Starside ===
- BSI Starside: The Cause of Death (2006)
- BSI Starside: Death Sentence (2007)
- BSI Starside: Final Inquiries (2008)

=== Corellian (Star Wars) ===
- Star Wars: Ambush at Corellia (1995)
- Star Wars: Assault at Selonia (1995)
- Star Wars: Showdown at Centerpoint (1995)

=== Stand-alone novels ===
- Orphan of Creation (1988)
- Farside Cannon (1988)
- The War Machine: Crisis of Empire III (1989), with David Drake
- Supernova (1991), with Eric Kotani
- The Modular Man (1992), accompanying the novel is an essay by Isaac Asimov "Intelligent Robots and Cybernetic Organisms."

=== Historical ===
- Time Capsule: The Book of Record (2010) with Thomas B. Allen
- Mr. Lincoln's High Tech War (2008) with Thomas B. Allen
