= The Modular Man =

1992 novel by Roger MacBride Allen

- Author: Roger MacBride Allen
- Cover artist: Bruce Jensen
- Language: English
- Genre: Science fiction
- Publisher: Bantam Books
- Publication date: 1992
- Publication place: United States
- Media type: Print
- Pages: 306
- ISBN: 0-553-29559-4

The Modular Man is a science fiction novel by American writer Roger MacBride Allen. It is the fourth in the Next Wave series.

== Plot summary ==
The novel concerns the issue of personhood and what it takes to be considered a member of the moral universe. There are three main characters: Herbert the vacuum cleaner, who is modified by his owner, David Bailey, a scientist who specializes in figuring out how to "mindload". Mindloading is the act of a human downloading his mind into a machine. A successful mindload entails the death of the human. It is a way for humans to become immortal, if only in the form of vacuum cleaner.

The book begins with the arrest of Herbert, the vacuum cleaner, for David's murder. David's wife, Suzanne Jantille, is a trial attorney who is a quadriplegic as a result of a car crash that also paralyzed her husband. She lives through a "Remote person" who has all human senses except for the ability to feel by touch. She can guide the remote person through a helmet attached to her "bio body" and retrieves all "video and audio" signals through the remote. She can function as a whole human being, but the outside world notices that she is a remote—and does not approve.

Suzanne defends Herbie, with the help of an astute journalist and a police officer who has access to documents that she wouldn't otherwise. The book ends with a recognition of David’s humanity due to the ultimate confusion in the courtroom. It also ends with the death of Suzanne’s bio-body, and in turn, her ultimate death.
