= Intervertebral disc damage and spaceflight =

Astronauts have expressed an increased incidence of back pain during spaceflight and herniated intervertebral discs (IVD) have been diagnosed upon return of Skylab and Shuttle spaceflight participants.

These conditions and symptoms may be from previous back injury, but the evidence of IVD injuries raises the possibility that astronauts are at an increased risk of intervertebral disc damage during loading scenarios experienced during exploration missions (re-entry to a gravitational field and activities on planetary surfaces). To date, flight data related to potential back injuries have focused on spine elongation and the well-established effects of mechanical unloading on intervertebral discs.

== Causes and current studies ==
Sixty-eight percent of early astronauts, through 1991, who have flown in space have reported generalized back pain. The pain is considered most painful during early flight and lessens as the flight progresses.

Possible causes of back pain in flight may be associated with:

- the elongation of the vertebral column due to lowered gravitational forces
- Core and back muscle weakness including space-induced atrophy of back muscles
- increased strain of proximal facet joint capsules
- fractured innervated vertebral end plates
- disc degeneration
- herniation of anulus fibrosus

Regardless of the cause, astronauts may be at an increased risk of intervertebral disc injury or damage when the swollen discs are subjected to excessive forces or torques while working on planetary surfaces. Exploration missions on planetary surfaces may also introduce habitability issues that could induce excessive torsional stress, an established risk factor for herniation of anulus fibrosus.

Currently, there is minimal in- and post-flight data that would characterize the changes in intervertebral discs in crewmembers to assess how these changes would predispose the discs to injury under re-loading. Herniated nucleus pulposus is known to occur in aviators exposed to high G-force environments and has occurred in astronauts after a mission.

The relative risk rate of intervertebral disc damage has only recently been researched, but there is currently no evidence that links the origin of intervertebral disc damage with changes to the disc as a result of spaceflight.

Based upon the intervertebral disc tissue analysis of unweighted animals, biochemical changes to the nucleus pulposus during spaceflight will affect the ability of the osmotic pressure and elasticity of the nucleus pulposus to resist compressive loading. Biochemical changes in the intervertebral discs of crewmembers after flight have not been identified, but there is in vitro research with bovine cartilage explants to use magnetic resonance technology to correlate changes in intervertebral disc proteoglycan content with the T_{1 rho} relaxation of protons. This biomarker will enable non-invasive monitoring of proteoglycan content as a method of assessing the biochemical impact of weightlessness.

=== Computer based simulation information ===
Studies applying Finite Element Modeling (FEM) to IVDs under the lower osmotic pressure of the space environment shows that the appearance of a crack in the IVD experiencing lower osmotic pressure will increase the IVD risk for injury. FEM was also used to demonstrate that static loading alone will not promote fluid extrusion from IVDs swollen during bed rest or weightlessness. Fluid expulsion will increase with the increased frequency of loading.

Future work in this simulation capability needs to be pursued.

=== Risk in context of exploration operational scenarios ===
Defining the cause of back pain and IVD injury due to spaceflight remains an open issue. Assumptions and presumptions considered include:

- the absence of axial loading and of forces due to atrophy of back muscles predispose crewmembers to IVD injury
- the risk of detrimental changes to back and to IVD structure and biochemistry will increase with increasing unloaded periods in weightlessness
- the risk for back injury and for IVD damage will be greater with the larger G forces experienced during re-entry, landing and surface activities

== Spaceflight evidence ==
During the 84-day Skylab 4 mission, the spine elongation of one astronaut was measured and recorded to the 1/16th inch (Thornton, 1987). This study described an asymptomatic increase in height during flight that plateaued at 29 days. The total height increase was 1.5 in (3.8 cm), measured at the end of the mission. This elongation is presumed to be due to the expansion of intervertebral discs during weightlessness (axial unloading). The astronaut also reported back pain on landing day that was associated with a herniated intervertebral disc.

== Astronaut chart review ==
A retrospective chart review to evaluate the incidence of intervertebral disc damage after several astronauts developed cervical or lumbar herniated nucleus pulposus in the immediate postflight period. This study specifically compared the incidence of intervertebral disc damage in astronauts to an age-matched control population of persons who have never flown in space. This review also ought to clarify whether there is an increased risk for intervertebral disc damage due to:

- exposure to high- and low-G environments
- extended periods in an abnormal posture
- changes to intervertebral disc structure due to expansion in the absence of axial loading

It is unclear if changes due to spaceflight increase the risk of intervertebral disc damage since there is evidence that many of the injured astronauts have previously had multiple exposures to excessive G-forces as high-performance jet pilots (6-20 G's) or to vibrational forces as helicopter pilots.

The pathophysiology of intervertebral disc injury after spaceflight has not been clearly identified. The documented expansion of disc volume after spaceflight, together with the intervertebral disc injuries after reloading in Earth's gravity, suggests that the adaptive changes of the intervertebral disc in weightlessness disrupts the balance between osmotic pressure of the nucleus pulposus and the resistive collagen structure of the anuli fibrosi, thereby reducing the ability of the intervertebral disc structure to withstand re-exposure to G forces. Repeated, previous exposures to excessive G forces in high-performance jets may also have weakened the intervertebral disc structures, particularly in the cervical vertebrae, increasing the susceptibility of these discs to damage. The relative risk of spaceflight-induced intervertebral disc injury needs to be delineated by comparing the absolute risks of the astronaut population with that of a terrestrial control cohort with similar flight history.

== Ground based evidence ==
Intervertebral disc volume changes were quantified by magnetic resonance imaging in response to varying scenarios of axial unloading. The cross-sectional areas and the transverse proton relaxation constants (T2) of IVDs were indices used to monitor adaptive changes of the intervertebral discs to overnight bed rest (over 5 weeks and 17 weeks) and after 8 days of spaceflight. The averaged expansion of IVDs with bed rest appeared to reach an equilibrium anywhere between 9 hours and 4 days of unloading with the expansion ranging between 10-40% of baseline, pre-bed rest values (mean = 22%). There were mild increases in T2 relaxation times relative to increases in disc area. Restoration of IVD volumes after unloading was not evaluated systematically but Table 1 provides a relative comparison of the elapsed time in 1 G at which time the measured IVD volumes were no different from baseline measurements; the relative periods of recovery appear to lengthen as the period of IVD adaptation to unloading increases.

Table 1. Relative comparison of the elapsed time in 1G
Period of Unloading	Relative Time Before Recovery
8 days spaceflight	< 24 hours
5 weeks bedrest	days
17 weeks bedrest	> 6 weeks

== See also ==
- Spinal disc herniation
