= Neutron monitor =

A neutron monitor is a ground-based detector designed to measure the number of high-energy charged particles striking the Earth's atmosphere from outer space. For historical reasons the incoming particles are called "cosmic rays", but the majority are particles, predominantly protons and Helium nuclei. Most of the time, a neutron monitor records galactic cosmic rays and their variation with the 11-year sunspot cycle and 22-year magnetic cycle. Occasionally the Sun emits cosmic rays of sufficient energy and intensity to raise radiation levels on Earth's surface to the degree that they are readily detected by neutron monitors. They are termed "ground level enhancements" (GLE).

The neutron monitor was invented by University of Chicago Professor John A. Simpson in 1948. The "18-tube" NM64 monitor, which today is the international standard, is a large instrument weighing about 36 tons.

== How it works ==
=== Atmospheric cascades ===
When a high-energy particle from outer space ("primary" cosmic ray) encounters Earth, its first interaction is usually with an air molecule at an altitude of 30 km or so. This encounter causes the air molecule to split into smaller pieces, each having high energy. The smaller pieces are called "secondary" cosmic rays, and they in turn hit other air molecules resulting in more secondary cosmic rays. The process continues and is termed an "atmospheric cascade". If the primary cosmic ray that started the cascade has energy over 500 MeV, some of its secondary byproducts (including neutrons) will reach ground level where they can be detected by neutron monitors.

=== Measurement strategy ===
Since they were invented by Prof. Simpson in 1948 there have been various types of neutron monitors. Notable are the "IGY-type" monitors deployed around the world during the 1957 International Geophysical Year (IGY) and the much larger "NM64" monitors (also known as "supermonitors"). All neutron monitors however employ the same measurement strategy that exploits the dramatic difference in the way high and low energy neutrons interact with different nuclei. (There is almost no interaction between neutrons and electrons.) High energy neutrons interact rarely but when they do they are able to disrupt nuclei, particularly heavy nuclei, producing many low energy neutrons in the process. Low energy neutrons have a much higher probability of interacting with nuclei, but these interactions are typically elastic (like billiard ball collisions) that transfer energy but do not change the structure of the nucleus. The exceptions to this are a few specific nuclei (most notably ^{10}B and ^{3}He) that quickly absorb extremely low energy neutrons, then disintegrate releasing very energetic charged particles. With this behavior of neutron interactions in mind, Professor Simpson ingeniously selected the four main components of a neutron monitor:

1. Reflector. An outer shell of proton-rich material – paraffin in the early neutron monitors, polyethylene in the more modern ones. Low energy neutrons cannot penetrate this material, but are not absorbed by it. Thus environmental, non-cosmic ray induced neutrons are kept out of the monitor and low energy neutrons generated in the lead are kept in. This material is largely transparent to the cosmic ray induced cascade neutrons.
2. Producer. The producer is lead, and by weight it is the major component of a neutron monitor. Fast neutrons that get through the reflector interact with the lead to produce, on average about 10 much lower energy neutrons. This both amplifies the cosmic signal and produces neutrons that cannot easily escape the reflector.
3. Moderator. The moderator, also a proton rich material like the reflector, slows down the neutrons now confined within the reflector, which makes them more likely to be detected.
4. Proportional Counter. This is the heart of a neutron monitor. After very slow neutrons are generated by the reflector, producer, moderator, and so forth, they encounter a nucleus in the proportional counter and cause it to disintegrate. This nuclear reaction produces energetic charged particles that ionize gas in the proportional counter, producing an electrical signal. In the early Simpson monitors, the active component in the gas was ^{10}B, which produced a signal via the reaction (n + ^{10}B → α + ^{7}Li). Recent proportional counters use the reaction (n + ^{3}He → ^{3}H + p) which yields 764 keV.

== What it measures ==
Neutron monitors measure by proxy the intensity of cosmic rays striking the Earth, and its variation with time. These variations occur on many different time scales (and are still a subject of research). The three listed below are examples:

=== Solar cycles ===
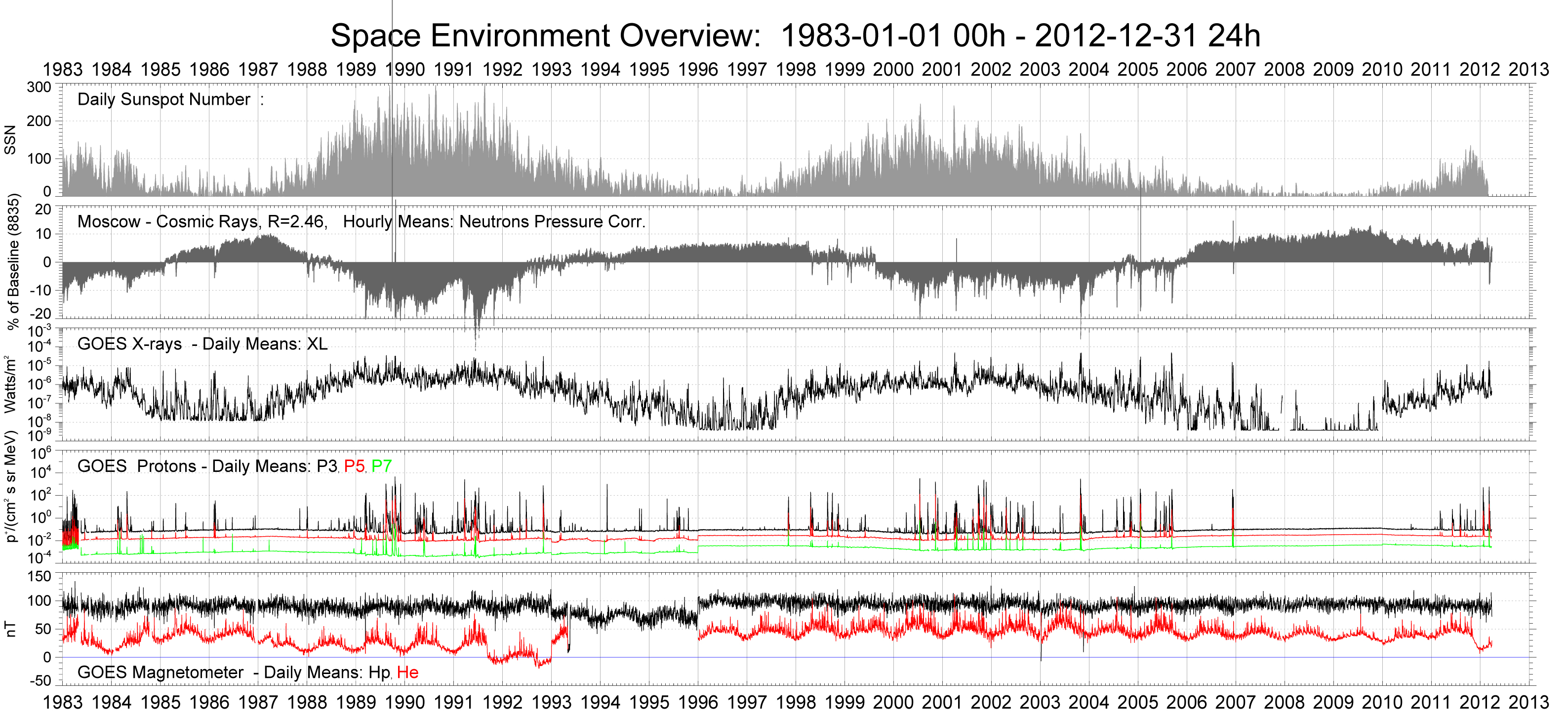
An overview of the space environment shows the relationship between the sunspot cycle and galactic cosmic rays.

In a process termed “solar modulation” the Sun and solar wind alter the intensity and energy spectrum of Galactic cosmic rays that enter the Solar System. When the Sun is active, fewer Galactic cosmic rays reach Earth than during times when the Sun is quiet. For this reason, Galactic cosmic rays follow an 11-year cycle like the Sun, but in the opposite direction: High solar activity corresponds to low cosmic rays, and vice versa.

=== Long-term stability ===
The main advantage of the neutron monitor is its long-term stability making them suitable for studied of cosmic-ray variability through decades.

Cosmic ray variability recorded by Oulu neutron monitor since 1964

The most stable long-running neutron monitors are: Oulu, Inuvik, Moscow, Kerguelen, Apatity and Newark neutron monitors.

=== Forbush decreases ===
Occasionally the Sun expels an enormous quantity of mass and energy in a "Coronal Mass Ejection" (CME). As this matter moves through the solar system, it suppresses the intensity of Galactic cosmic rays. The suppression was first reported by Scott Forbush and hence is termed a "Forbush decrease".

=== Ground level enhancements ===
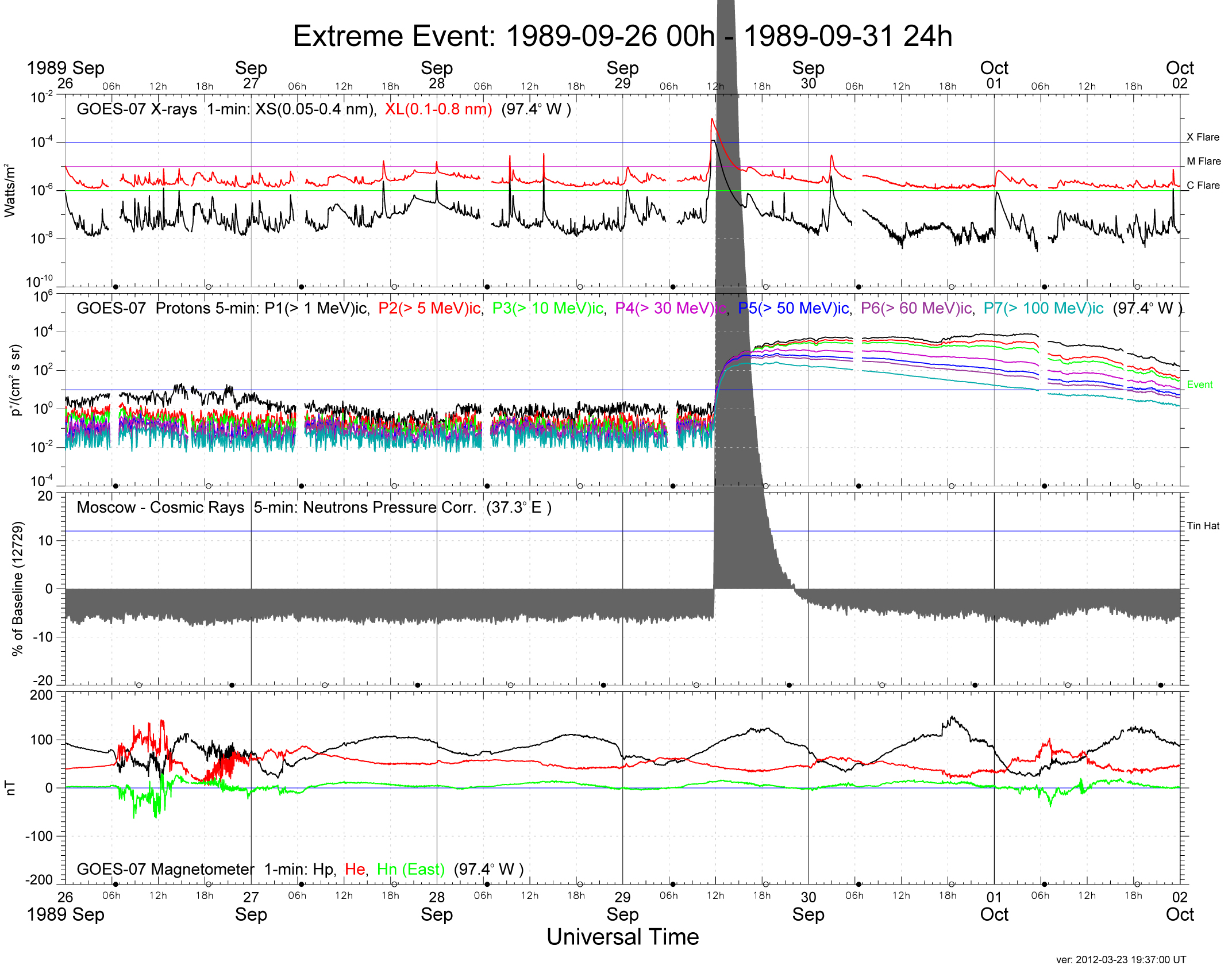
Ground Level Enhancement — September 1989.

Approximately 10-15 times per decade, the Sun emits particles of sufficient energy and intensity to raise radiation levels on Earth's surface. The official list of GLEs is kept by the International GLE database. The largest of these events, termed a "ground level enhancement" (GLE) was observed on February 23, 1956. The most recent GLE, (#72) occurred on September 10, 2017, as a result of an X-class flare and was measured on the surface of both the Earth (by Neutron Monitors) and Mars (by the Radiation Assessment Detector on the Mars Science Laboratory's Curiosity Rover).

== Neutron monitor arrays ==
In the early days of neutron monitoring, discoveries could be made with a monitor at a single location. However, the scientific yield of neutron monitors is greatly enhanced when data from numerous monitors are analyzed in concert. Modern applications frequently employ extensive arrays of monitors. In effect the observing instrument is not any isolated instrument, but rather the array. NMDB (Real-time Neutron Monitor DataBase) gives access to the largest network of stations worldwide (more than 50 stations) through its interface NEST. Networking neutron monitors yields new information in several areas, among them:

1. Anisotropy: Neutron monitor stations at different locations around the globe view different directions in space. By combining data from these stations, the anisotropy of cosmic rays can be determined.
2. Energy Spectrum: Earth's magnetic field repels cosmic rays more strongly in equatorial regions than in polar regions. By comparing data from stations located at different latitudes, the energy spectrum can be determined.
3. Relativistic Solar Neutrons: These are very rare events recorded by stations near Earth's equator that face the Sun. The information they provide is unique because neutrally charged particles (like neutrons) travel through space unaffected by magnetic fields in space. A relativistic solar neutron event was first reported for a 1982 event.
