= Scott Forbush =

American astronomer, physicist and geophysicist (1904–1984)

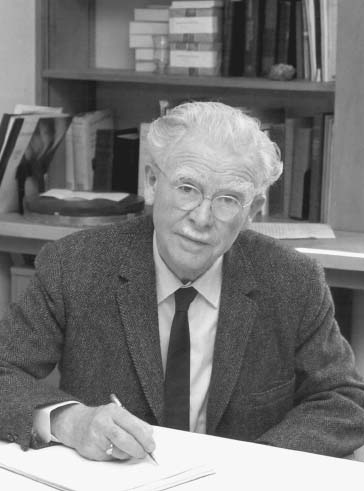
- Born: April 10, 1904; Hudson, Ohio
- Died: April 4, 1984 (aged 79); Charlottesville, Virginia
- Education: Case School of Applied Science
- Known for: solar-interplanetary-terrestrial physics, and the Forbush Effect
- Awards: The Chree Medal and Prize (1961)
- Scientific career
- Fields: Astronomy, Physics, and Geophysicist.

Scott Ellsworth Forbush (April 10, 1904 – April 4, 1984) was an American astronomer, physicist and geophysicist who is recognized as having laid the observational foundations for many of the central features of solar-interplanetary-terrestrial physics, which at the time was an underdeveloped field of study. In 1937 Forbush discovered the Forbush Effect: an occasional decrease in the intensity of cosmic rays as observed on Earth that is caused by the solar wind and its interaction with the magnetosphere. Scott conducted most of his research during his career at the Department of Terrestrial Magnetism (DTM) of the Carnegie Institution of Washington where he was appointed chairman of a section on theoretical geophysics in 1957. Forbush used statistical methods in analyses of magnetic storms, solar activity, rotation of the Earth, and the rotation of the sun, and the correlation of this geophysical and solar phenomena with temporal variations of cosmic-ray intensity.

Scott was widowed once and married twice, the first time to Clara Lundell, a concert pianist who died in 1967, and for the second time in June 1970, 14 years before his death, to Julie Daves, a science writer and watercolor artist. Scott died in 1984 in Charlottesville, Virginia, having suffered from pneumonia. He was survived by his wife Julie and his sister Louise Boyd of Hudson, Ohio.

== Early years ==
Born in 1904 near Hudson, Ohio on a farm, Scott spent his childhood walking back and forth to a small school 2 miles away, and working on his parents’ farm. His mother was a teacher and encouraged his curiosity and interest in learning by enrolling him in the nearby Western Reserve Academy. Scott graduated in 1920 and a year later enrolled in the Case School of Applied Science in Cleveland. In 1925 he graduated with a physics major and went on to try graduate study in physics at Ohio State University briefly, before he decided that observational geophysics was much more appealing than pure physics and began seeking employment in that field. At a later point he resumed his formal graduate work with a fresh appreciation of its direct applicability to his area of interest. In 1925 Scott gained his first employment by the National Bureau of Standards in Washington, D.C.

Starting in September 1927, after having held his position with the National Bureau of Standards for roughly one year, he became employed by the Department of Terrestrial Magnetism (DTM) of the Carnegie Institution of Washington, which became a pivotal point for him in his professional career. As an observer at DTM's magnetic observatory, he worked in Huancayo, Peru, in the Andes 100 miles east of Lima, before joining the staff of the famous nonmagnetic sailing ship, Carnegie, two years later. Carnegie was a vessel built for DTM's worldwide survey of the geomagnetic field. After his ship suffered an explosion in November 1929, he returned to DTM and was reassigned to Huancayo, where he was able to publish a paper entitled Huancayo Magnetic Observatory June to September, 1930 in the Journal of Geophysical Research. In 1931 he was granted permission to finish his graduate studies in physics and mathematics at Johns Hopkins University. He became married in 1932 to Clara Lundell, concert pianist, and was widowed in 1967.

== Research ==
Scott Forbush in larger part of his career was employed by the Carnegie Institution of Washington in the Department of Terrestrial Magnetism in Washington D.C. In 1957 he was named chairman of a section on theoretical geophysics at DTM, and around the same time became a chairman of the Panel on Cosmic Rays of the U.S. National Committee for a year. With these titles he helped to organize and coordinate both national and international efforts in the observation of cosmic ray intensity world-wide using neutron monitors developed by John A. Simpson. The bulk of his research was pertaining to geophysical and solar activity, as he contributed a reliable foundation for fundamental cosmic ray effects and also made discoveries of his own. Such effects include the 22-year cycle in the amplitude of the diurnal variation, the 11-year cyclic variation of intensity and its anticorrelation with the solar activity cycle by use of measuring sunspot numbers, worldwide impulsive decreases (which were termed Forbush decreases after himself) of intensity followed by gradual recovery, the sporadic emission of very energetic charged particles by solar flares, the absence of a detectable sidereal, diurnal variation of intensity, the diurnal variation of intensity, and the quasi-persistent 27-day variation of intensity. He became a master of the calibration and maintenance of these meters which measured charged secondaries, and the effects of temperature and barometric pressure in relation to Earth's external magnetic field and its interaction with the overlying atmosphere.

For 5 years, starting in 1940 Scott was forced to discontinue his research due to his contextual surroundings of World War II in progress. Instead for this period he headed a division on mathematical analysis for the Naval Ordnance Laboratory. His work there was important in that it contributed towards the development of degaussing techniques for ships and submarines. He helped to guide the development of airborne magnetometers for the detection of submerged submarines. After World War II ended and he returned to DTM he was pulled aside once again for a year due to the Korean War in 1951, where he directed a mathematical analysis division of an operations research office based at Johns Hopkins University.

From 1958 to 1984 Scott extended his earlier seminal work on correlations between cosmic-ray intensity, geomagnetic storms and solar activity, while traveling around to lecture at international meetings and expanding his personal research to become more inclusive for collaboration with other researchers.

== Publications ==
Scott E. Forbush published a book called Geomagnetism, Cosmic Radiation, and Statistical Procedures for Geophysicists (Oxford, 1940). A compilation of his papers published after his death was titled Cosmic Rays, the Sun and Geomagnetism: The Works of Scott E. Forbush by Scott E. Forbush (American Geophysical Union, June 1993). He published many articles in journals such as the Journal of Geophysical Research and The American Physical Society. His publications include:

- Three Unusual Cosmic-Ray Increases Possibly Due to Charged Particles from the Sun.

Forbush, Scott E.
Phys. Rev. 70, 771-772. The American Physical Society. (11/1946)

- World-Wide Cosmic-Ray Variations, 1937-1952

Forbush, Scott E.
Journal of Geophysical Research, vol. 59, issue 4, pp. 525-542 (JGR Homepage). (12/1954)

- Cosmic-Ray Intensity Variations during Two Solar Cycles

Forbush, Scott E.
Journal of Geophysical Research, vol. 63, issue 4, pp. 651-669 (JGR Homepage). (12/1958)
