= Lynn Kistler =

Physicist

Lynn Marie Kistler
- Education: University of Maryland
- Scientific career
- Workplaces: University of New Hampshire
- Thesis: A study of the energy spectra of the major ion species in the ring current region of the magnetosphere during geomagnetic storms (1987)

Lynn Kistler is a physicist known for her research on the magnetosphere that protects Earth from radiation from space.

== Education and career ==
Kistler has a B.S. in physics from Harvey Mudd College, and an M.S. and a Ph.D. in physics from the University of Maryland. As of 2021, Kistler is a professor of physics and the director of the Space Science Center at the University of New Hampshire. In 2016, Kistler was elected fellow of the American Geophysical Union. The citation recognized her "... prolific seminal contributions to our understanding of the role of heavy terrestrial ions in magnetospheric structure and dynamics."

== Research ==
Kistler is known for her research on Earth's magnetosphere, where she examines the heavy ions found in the ring current and changes in the flow of O^{+} ions during geomagnetic storms. Kistler's research includes the design and testing of instruments placed on satellites to examine processes in the magnetosphere, including the Ion Mass Spectrum Analyzer and instruments within the Solar Orbiter mission.

=== Selected publications ===
- Kistler, L. M.; Ipavich, F. M.; Hamilton, D. C.; Gloeckler, G.; Wilken, B.; Kremser, G.; Stüdemann, W. (1989). "Energy spectra of the major ion species in the ring current during geomagnetic storms". Journal of Geophysical Research. 94 (A4): 3579. Bibcode:1989JGR....94.3579K. doi:10.1029/JA094iA04p03579.
- Kistler, L. M.; Möbius, E.; Baumjohann, W.; Paschmann, G.; Hamilton, D. C. (1 March 1992). "Pressure changes in the plasma sheet during substorm injections". Journal of Geophysical Research: Space Physics. 97 (A3): 2973–2983. Bibcode:1992JGR....97.2973K. doi:10.1029/91JA02802.
- Kistler, L. M. (2005). "Contribution of nonadiabatic ions to the cross-tail current in an O + dominated thin current sheet" (PDF). Journal of Geophysical Research. 110 (A6): A06213. Bibcode:2005JGRA..110.6213K. doi:10.1029/2004JA010653. S2CID 130420203.

== Awards and honors ==
- Fellow, American Geophysical Union (2016)
- 2023 American Geophysical Union James Van Allen Lecture Award
