= Solar-Terrestrial Observer for the Response of the Magnetosphere =

The Solar-Terrestrial Observer for the Response of the Magnetosphere (STORM) was one of five mission proposals selected to proceed to Phase A concept studies as part of the 2019 NASA Heliophysics Medium Class Explorer Announcement of Opportunity. STORM will provide the first-ever global view of the Sun-Earth system. STORM takes simultaneous observations of the solar wind and the response of Earth’s magnetosphere, including the magnetopause, auroral oval, and ring current dynamics, using global multi-spectral and neutral atom imaging to quantify the global circulation of the energy that powers space weather.

STORM comprehensively fills gaps in our current understanding of the solar wind-magnetosphere interaction by addressing the following science objectives: (A) energy transfer at the dayside magnetopause, (B) energy circulation and transfer through the magnetotail, (C) energy sources and sinks for the ring current, and (D) energy feedback from the inner magnetosphere. STORM was led by Principal Investigator Dr. David Sibeck and Deputy Principal Investigator the late Dr. Michael Collier at NASA’s Goddard Space Flight Center.

== Science goals and objectives ==
STORM’s main scientific goal is to quantify the global circulation of energy in the solar wind-magnetosphere interaction that powers space weather in Earth’s environment. STORM will achieve this goal by quantifying the flow of energy in four key regions of the Sun-Earth system and addressing target science objectives in each region. These are:

- A) Energy transfer at the dayside magnetopause: How does global magnetopause reconnection control the flow of solar wind energy into the magnetosphere? What are the spatial and temporal properties of this interaction as a function of solar wind conditions?
- B) Energy Circulation and Transfer Through the Magnetotail: How does magnetotail reconnection regulate the circulation of energy from the dayside, through the magnetotail and into the inner magnetosphere. What controls the occurrence and significance of differing reconnection modes?
- C) Energy Sources and Sinks for the Ring Current: How efficiently do magnetotail response modes energize ring current ions? How do transport and loss mechanisms affect the subsequent evolution of the energized ring current?
- D) Energy feedback from the inner magnetosphere: How does the ring current affect the location of the dayside magnetopause and the occurrence of reconnection in the tail?

== Mission Design ==
=== Onboard Instruments ===
STORM has a complement of 6 onboard instruments: 2 in-situ instruments and 4 imagers. STORM’s two in-situ instruments, the magnetometer (MAG) and ion electron spectrometer (IES), measure the local magnetic field and plasma, respectively. STORM’s 4 imagers, the soft x-ray imager (XRI)[5], the far ultraviolet imager (FUV), the energetic neutral atom imager (ENA), and LAICA, make nearly continuous observations of the magnetopause and bow shock, the auroral oval, the Earth’s ring current, and the exosphere (respectively).

==== Ground-based Instruments ====
STORM’s 6 onboard instruments are further supplemented with an array of all-sky imagers (ASI) which provide high spatio-temporal observations of the aurora. STORM will deploy 28 ASI at 14 locations across North America to image the green (557.7 nm) and red (630.0 nm) line aurora.

==== Orbit ====
STORM employs a single lunar swing by to enter a circular 90° inclination orbit with a radius of 30 Earth radii and a period of 9.65 days which precesses a full 360° per year. This orbit enables observations of the magnetosphere’s response to varying solar wind conditions from the full range of vantage points over time scales encompassing all space weather phenomena. Furthermore, this orbit allows scientific return 100% of the time from at least a single instrument and up to 83% of the time from all instruments, allowing for extended observation periods.
