= Cosmic storm =

Cosmic storm may refer to:

- Cosmic ray burst
- Geomagnetic storm, the interaction of the Sun's outburst with Earth's magnetic field smn
- Interacting galaxies
- Coronal mass ejection
- Solar flare
- Nebula

== Popular culture ==
- The Cosmic Storm, a Fantastic Four book based on the movie
