= Geomagnetic storm =

Disturbance of the Earth's magnetosphere

A geomagnetic storm, also known as a magnetic storm, is a temporary disturbance of the Earth's magnetosphere that is driven by interactions between the magnetosphere and large-scale transient plasma and magnetic field structures that originate on or near the Sun.

The structures that produce geomagnetic storms include interplanetary coronal mass ejections (CME) and corotating interaction regions (CIR). The former often originate from solar active regions, while the latter originate at the boundary between high- and low-speed streams of solar wind. The frequency of geomagnetic storms increases and decreases with the sunspot cycle. During solar maxima, geomagnetic storms occur more often, with the majority driven by CMEs.

When these structures reach Earth, the increase in the solar wind pressure initially compresses the magnetosphere. The solar wind's magnetic field interacts with the Earth's magnetic field and transfers an increased energy into the magnetosphere. Both interactions cause an increase in plasma movement through the magnetosphere (driven by increased electric fields inside the magnetosphere) and an increase in electric current in the magnetosphere and ionosphere. During the main phase of a geomagnetic storm, enhanced magnetospheric currents (especially the ring current) weaken the Earth’s dayside magnetic field, so that the solar wind dynamic pressure pushes the magnetopause boundary inward, closer to Earth.

Several space weather phenomena tend to be associated with geomagnetic storms. These include solar energetic particle (SEP) events, geomagnetically induced currents (GIC), ionospheric storms and disturbances that cause radio and radar scintillation, disruption of navigation by magnetic compass and auroral displays at much lower magnetic latitudes than normal.

The largest recorded geomagnetic storm, the Carrington Event in September 1859, took down parts of the recently created US telegraph network, starting fires and electrically shocking telegraph operators. In 1989, a geomagnetic storm energized ground induced currents that disrupted electric power distribution throughout most of Quebec and caused aurorae as far south as Texas.

== Definition ==
A geomagnetic storm is defined by changes in the Dst (disturbance – storm time) index. The Dst index estimates the globally averaged change of the horizontal component of the Earth's magnetic field at the magnetic equator based on measurements from a few magnetometer stations. Dst is computed once per hour and reported in near-real-time. During quiet times, Dst is between +20 and −20 nano-Tesla (nT).

A geomagnetic storm has three phases: initial, main and recovery. The initial phase is characterized by Dst (or its one-minute component SYM-H) increasing by 20 to 50 nT in tens of minutes. The initial phase is also referred to as a storm sudden commencement (SSC). However, not all geomagnetic storms have an initial phase and not all sudden increases in Dst or SYM-H are followed by a geomagnetic storm. The main phase of a geomagnetic storm is defined by Dst decreasing to less than −50 nT. The selection of −50 nT to define a storm is somewhat arbitrary. The minimum value during a storm will be between −50 and approximately −600 nT. The duration of the main phase is typically 2–8 hours. The recovery phase is when Dst changes from its minimum value to its quiet time value. The recovery phase may last as short as 8 hours or as long as 7 days.

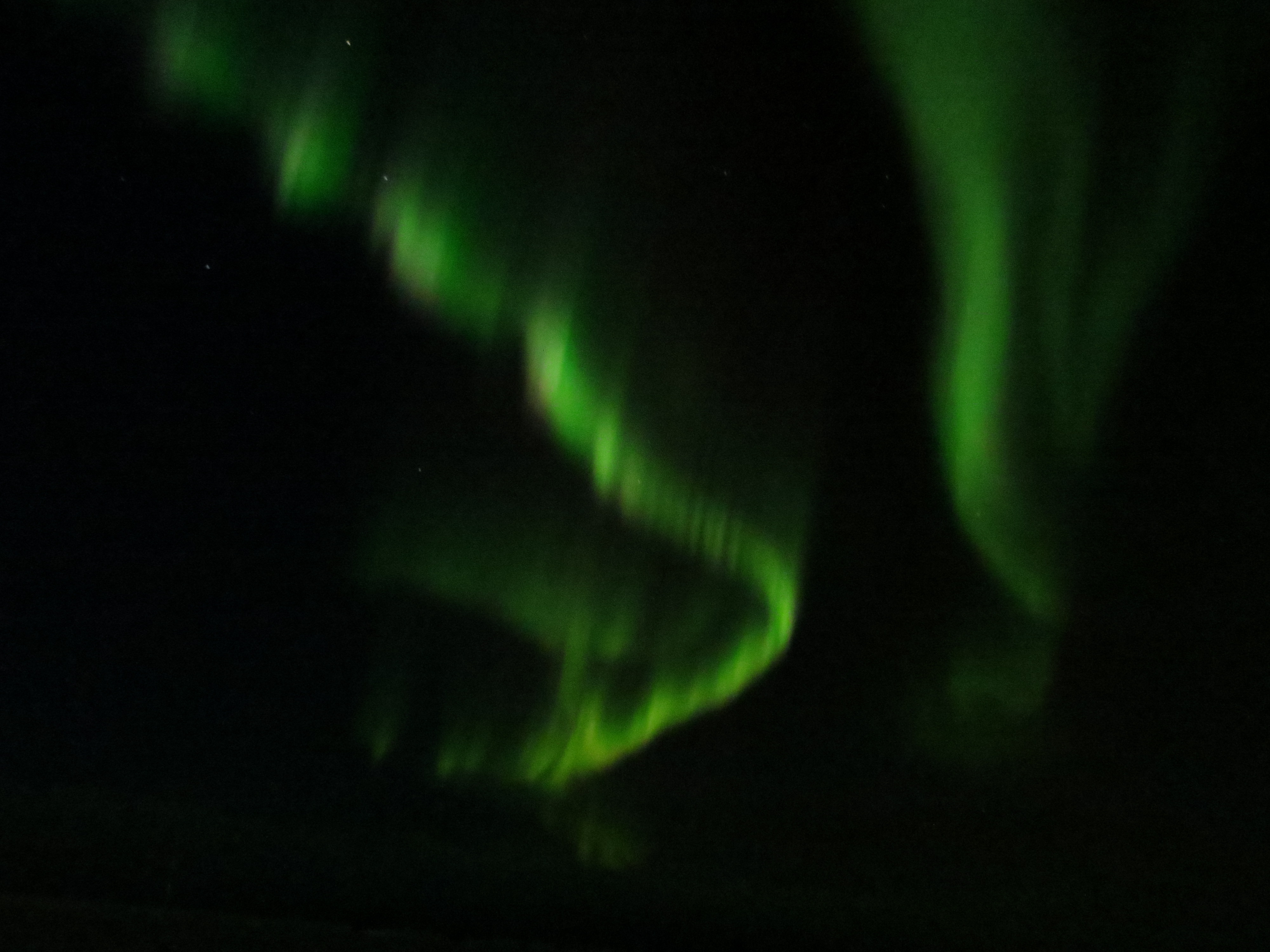
Aurora borealis

The size of a geomagnetic storm is classified as moderate (−50 nT > minimum of Dst > −100 nT), intense (−100 nT > minimum Dst > −250 nT) or super-storm (minimum of Dst < −250 nT).

== Measuring intensity ==
Geomagnetic storm intensity is reported in several different ways, including:

- K-index
- A-index
- The G-scale used by the U.S. National Oceanic and Atmospheric Administration, which rates the storm from G1 to G5 (i.e. G1, G2, G3, G4, G5 in order), where G1 is the weakest storm classification (corresponding to a Kp value of 5), and G5 is the strongest (corresponding to a Kp value of 9).

== History of the theory ==
In 1930, Sydney Chapman and Vincenzo C. A. Ferraro wrote an article, A New Theory of Magnetic Storms, that sought to explain the phenomenon. They argued that whenever the Sun emits a solar flare it also emits a plasma cloud, now known as a coronal mass ejection. They postulated that this plasma travels at a velocity such that it reaches Earth within 113 days, though we now know this journey takes 1 to 5 days. They wrote that the cloud then compresses the Earth's magnetic field and thus increases this field at the Earth's surface. Chapman and Ferraro's work drew on that of, among others, Kristian Birkeland, who had used recently discovered cathode-ray tubes to show that the rays were deflected towards the poles of a magnetic sphere. He theorised that a similar phenomenon was responsible for auroras, explaining why they are more frequent in polar regions.

== Occurrences ==
The first scientific observation of the effects of a geomagnetic storm occurred early in the 19th century: from May 1806 until June 1807, Alexander von Humboldt recorded the bearing of a magnetic compass in Berlin. On 21 December 1806, he noticed that his compass had become erratic during a bright auroral event.

On September 1–2, 1859, the largest recorded geomagnetic storm occurred. From August 28 until September 2, 1859, numerous sunspots and solar flares were observed on the Sun, with the largest flare on September 1. This is referred to as the solar storm of 1859 or the Carrington Event. It can be assumed that a massive coronal mass ejection was launched from the Sun and reached the Earth within eighteen hours—a trip that normally takes three to four days. The horizontal field was reduced by 1600 nT as recorded by the Colaba Observatory. It is estimated that Dst would have been approximately −1760 nT. Telegraph wires in both the United States and Europe experienced induced voltage increases (emf), in some cases even delivering shocks to telegraph operators and igniting fires. Aurorae were seen as far south as Hawaii, Mexico, Cuba and Italy—phenomena that are usually only visible in polar regions. Ice cores show evidence that events of similar intensity recur at an average rate of approximately once per 500 years.

Since 1859, less severe storms have occurred, notably the aurora of November 17, 1882 and the May 1921 geomagnetic storm, both with disruption of telegraph service and initiation of fires, and 1960, when widespread radio disruption was reported.

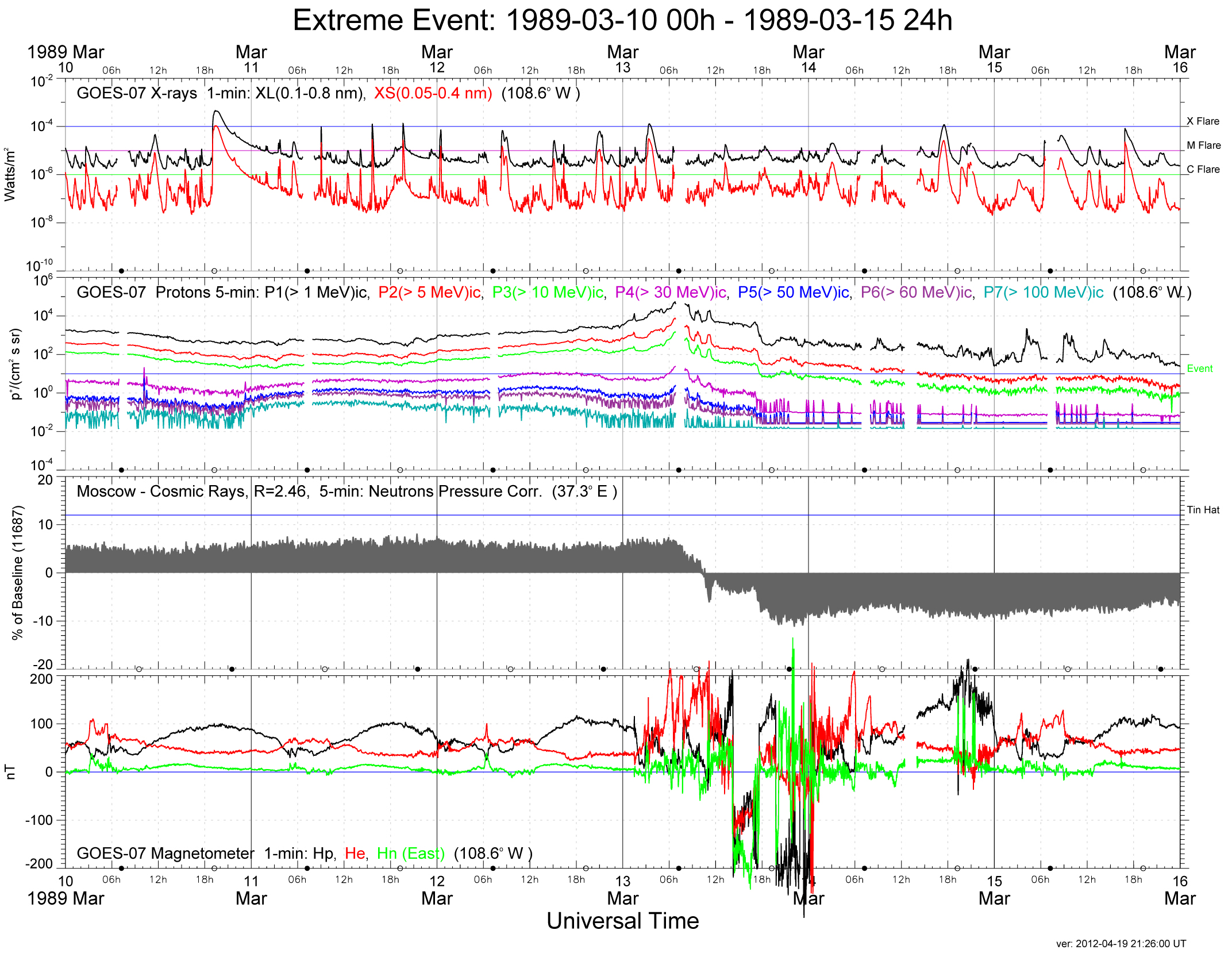
GOES-7 monitors space weather conditions during the Great Geomagnetic storm of March 1989. The Moscow neutron monitor recorded the passage of a CME as a drop in levels known as a Forbush decrease.

In early August 1972, a series of flares and solar storms peaks with a flare estimated around X20 producing the fastest CME transit ever recorded and a severe geomagnetic and proton storm that disrupted terrestrial electrical and communications networks, as well as satellites (at least one made permanently inoperative), and spontaneously detonated numerous U.S. Navy magnetic-influence sea mines in North Vietnam.

The March 1989 geomagnetic storm caused the collapse of the Hydro-Québec power grid in seconds as equipment protection relays tripped in a cascading sequence. Six million people were left without power for nine hours. The storm caused auroras as far south as Texas and Florida. The storm causing this event was the result of a coronal mass ejected from the Sun on March 9, 1989. The minimum Dst was −589 nT.

On July 14, 2000, an X5 class flare erupted (known as the Bastille Day event) and a coronal mass was launched directly at the Earth. A geomagnetic super storm occurred on July 15–17; the minimum of the Dst index was −301 nT. Despite the storm's strength, no power distribution failures were reported. The Bastille Day event was observed by Voyager 1 and Voyager 2, thus it is the farthest out in the Solar System that a solar storm has been observed.

Seventeen major flares erupted on the Sun between 19 October and 5 November 2003, including perhaps the most intense flare ever measured on the GOES XRS sensor—a huge X28 flare, resulting in an extreme radio blackout, on 4 November. These flares were associated with CME events that caused three geomagnetic storms between 29 October and 2 November, during which the second and third storms were initiated before the previous storm period had fully recovered. The minimum Dst values were −151, −353 and −383 nT. Another storm in this sequence occurred on 4–5 November with a minimum Dst of −69 nT. The last geomagnetic storm was weaker than the preceding storms, because the active region on the Sun had rotated beyond the meridian where the central portion CME created during the flare event passed to the side of the Earth. The whole sequence became known as the Halloween Solar Storm. The Wide Area Augmentation System (WAAS) operated by the Federal Aviation Administration (FAA) was offline for approximately 30 hours due to the storm. The Japanese ADEOS-2 satellite was severely damaged and the operation of many other satellites were interrupted due to the storm.

== Interactions with planetary processes ==
Magnetosphere in the near-Earth space environment

The solar wind also carries with it the Sun's magnetic field. This field will have either a North or South orientation. If the solar wind has energetic bursts, contracting and expanding the magnetosphere, or if the solar wind takes a southward polarization, geomagnetic storms can be expected. The southward field causes magnetic reconnection of the dayside magnetopause, rapidly injecting magnetic and particle energy into the Earth's magnetosphere.

During a geomagnetic storm, the ionosphere's F_{2} layer becomes unstable, fragments, and may even disappear. In the northern and southern pole regions of the Earth, auroras are observable.

== Instruments ==
Magnetometers monitor the auroral zone as well as the equatorial region. Two types of radar, coherent scatter and incoherent scatter, are used to probe the auroral ionosphere. By bouncing signals off ionospheric irregularities, which move with the field lines, one can trace their motion and infer magnetospheric convection.

Spacecraft instruments include:

- Magnetometers, usually of the flux gate type. Usually these are at the end of booms, to keep them away from magnetic interference by the spacecraft and its electric circuits.
- Electric sensors at the ends of opposing booms are used to measure potential differences between separated points, to derive electric fields associated with convection. The method works best at high plasma densities in low Earth orbit; far from Earth long booms are needed, to avoid shielding-out of electric forces.
- Radio sounders from the ground can bounce radio waves of varying frequency off the ionosphere, and by timing their return determine the electron density profile—up to its peak, past which radio waves no longer return. Radio sounders in low Earth orbit aboard the Canadian Alouette 1 (1962) and Alouette 2 (1965), beamed radio waves earthward and observed the electron density profile of the "topside ionosphere". Other radio sounding methods were also tried in the ionosphere (e.g. on IMAGE).
- Particle detectors include a Geiger counter, as was used for the original observations of the Van Allen radiation belt. Scintillator detectors came later, and still later "channeltron" electron multipliers found particularly wide use. To derive charge and mass composition, as well as energies, a variety of mass spectrograph designs were used. For energies up to about 50 keV (which constitute most of the magnetospheric plasma) time-of-flight spectrometers (e.g. "top-hat" design) are widely used.

Computers have made it possible to bring together decades of isolated magnetic observations and extract average patterns of electrical currents and average responses to interplanetary variations. They also run simulations of the global magnetosphere and its responses, by solving the equations of magnetohydrodynamics (MHD) on a numerical grid. Appropriate extensions must be added to cover the inner magnetosphere, where magnetic drifts and ionospheric conduction need to be taken into account. At polar regions, directly linked to the solar wind, large-scale ionospheric anomalies can be successfully modeled, even during geomagnetic super-storms. At smaller scales (comparable to a degree of latitude/longitude) the results are difficult to interpret, and certain assumptions about the high-latitude forcing uncertainty are needed.

== Impacts ==
=== Infrastructure ===
It has been suggested that a geomagnetic storm on the scale of the solar storm of 1859 today would cause billions or even trillions of dollars of damage to satellites, power grids and radio communications, and could cause electrical blackouts on a massive scale that might not be repaired for weeks, months, or even years. Such sudden electrical blackouts may threaten food production.

==== Electrical grid ====
When magnetic fields move about in the vicinity of a conductor such as a wire, a geomagnetically induced current is produced in the conductor. This happens on a grand scale during geomagnetic storms (the same mechanism also influenced telephone and telegraph lines before fiber optics, see above) on all long transmission lines. Long transmission lines (many kilometers in length) are thus subject to damage by this effect. Notably, this chiefly includes operators in China, North America, and Australia, especially in modern high-voltage, low-resistance lines. The European grid consists mainly of shorter transmission circuits, which are less vulnerable to damage.

The (nearly direct) currents induced in these lines from geomagnetic storms are harmful to electrical transmission equipment, especially transformers—inducing core saturation, constraining their performance (as well as tripping various safety devices), and causing coils and cores to heat up. In extreme cases, this heat can disable or destroy them, even inducing a chain reaction that can overload transformers. Most generators are connected to the grid via transformers, isolating them from the induced currents on the grid, making them much less susceptible to damage due to geomagnetically induced current. However, a transformer that is subjected to this will act as an unbalanced load to the generator, causing negative sequence current in the stator and consequently rotor heating.

A 2008 study by Metatech corporation concluded that a storm with a strength comparable to that of 1921 would destroy more than 300 transformers and leave over 130 million people without power in the United States, costing several trillion dollars. The extent of the disruption is debated, with some congressional testimony indicating a potentially indefinite outage until transformers can be replaced or repaired. These predictions are contradicted by a North American Electric Reliability Corporation report that concludes that a geomagnetic storm would cause temporary grid instability but no widespread destruction of high-voltage transformers. The report points out that the widely quoted Quebec grid collapse was not caused by overheating transformers but by the near-simultaneous tripping of seven relays. In 2016, the United States Federal Energy Regulatory Commission adopted NEARC rules for equipment testing for electric utilities. Implementation of any upgrades needed to protect against the effects of geomagnetic storms was required within four years, and the regulations also directed further research.

Besides the transformers being vulnerable to the effects of a geomagnetic storm, electricity companies can also be affected indirectly by the geomagnetic storm. For instance, Internet service providers may go down during geomagnetic storms (and/or remain non-operational long after). Electricity companies may have equipment requiring a working Internet connection to function, so during the period the Internet service provider is down, the electricity too may not be distributed.

By receiving geomagnetic storm alerts and warnings (e.g. by the Space Weather Prediction Center; via Space Weather satellites as SOHO or ACE), power companies can minimize damage to power transmission equipment, by momentarily disconnecting transformers or by inducing temporary blackouts. Preventive measures also exist, including preventing the inflow of GICs into the grid through the neutral-to-ground connection.

==== Communications ====
High frequency (3–30 MHz) communication systems use the ionosphere to reflect radio signals over long distances. Ionospheric storms can affect radio communication at all latitudes. Some frequencies are absorbed and others are reflected, leading to rapidly fluctuating signals and unexpected propagation paths. TV and commercial radio stations are little affected by solar activity, but ground-to-air, ship-to-shore, shortwave broadcast and amateur radio (mostly the bands below 30 MHz) are frequently disrupted. Radio operators using HF bands rely upon solar and geomagnetic alerts to keep their communication circuits up and running.

Military detection or early warning systems operating in the high frequency range are also affected by solar activity. The over-the-horizon radar bounces signals off the ionosphere to monitor the launch of aircraft and missiles from long distances. During geomagnetic storms, this system can be severely hampered by radio clutter. Also some submarine detection systems use the magnetic signatures of submarines as one input to their locating schemes. Geomagnetic storms can mask and distort these signals.

The Federal Aviation Administration routinely receives alerts of solar radio bursts so that they can recognize communication problems and avoid unnecessary maintenance. When an aircraft and a ground station are aligned with the Sun, high levels of noise can occur on air-control radio frequencies. This can also happen on UHF and SHF satellite communications, when an Earth station, a satellite and the Sun are in alignment. In order to prevent unnecessary maintenance on satellite communications systems aboard aircraft AirSatOne provides a live feed for geophysical events from NOAA's Space Weather Prediction Center. allows users to view observed and predicted space storms. Geophysical Alerts are important to flight crews and maintenance personnel to determine if any upcoming activity or history has or will have an effect on satellite communications, GPS navigation and HF Communications.

Telegraph lines in the past were affected by geomagnetic storms. Telegraphs used a single long wire for the data line, stretching for many miles, using the ground as the return wire and fed with DC power from a battery; this made them (together with the power lines mentioned below) susceptible to being influenced by the fluctuations caused by the ring current. The voltage/current induced by the geomagnetic storm could have diminished the signal, when subtracted from the battery polarity, or to overly strong and spurious signals when added to it; some operators learned to disconnect the battery and rely on the induced current as their power source. In extreme cases the induced current was so high the coils at the receiving side burst in flames, or the operators received electric shocks. Geomagnetic storms affect also long-haul telephone lines, including undersea cables unless they are fiber optic.

Damage to communications satellites can disrupt non-terrestrial telephone, television, radio and Internet links. The National Academy of Sciences reported in 2008 on possible scenarios of widespread disruption in the 2012–2013 solar peak. A solar superstorm could cause large-scale global months-long Internet outages. A study describes potential mitigation measures and exceptions – such as user-powered mesh networks, related peer-to-peer applications and new protocols – and analyzes the robustness of the current Internet infrastructure.

==== Navigation systems ====
Global navigation satellite systems (GNSS), and other navigation systems such as LORAN and the now-defunct OMEGA are adversely affected when solar activity disrupts their signal propagation. The OMEGA system consisted of eight transmitters located throughout the world. Airplanes and ships used the very low frequency signals from these transmitters to determine their positions. During solar events and geomagnetic storms, the system gave navigators information that was inaccurate by as much as several miles. If navigators had been alerted that a proton event or geomagnetic storm was in progress, they could have switched to a backup system.

GNSS signals are affected when solar activity causes sudden variations in the density of the ionosphere, causing the satellite signals to scintillate (like a twinkling star). The scintillation of satellite signals during ionospheric disturbances is studied at HAARP during ionospheric modification experiments. It has also been studied at the Jicamarca Radio Observatory.

One technology used to allow GNSS receivers to continue to operate in the presence of some confusing signals is Receiver Autonomous Integrity Monitoring (RAIM), used by GPS. However, RAIM is predicated on the assumption that a majority of the GPS constellation is operating properly, and so it is much less useful when the entire constellation is perturbed by global influences such as geomagnetic storms. Even if RAIM detects a loss of integrity in these cases, it may not be able to provide a useful, reliable signal.

==== Satellites ====
Geomagnetic storms and increased solar ultraviolet emission heat Earth's upper atmosphere, causing it to expand. The heated air rises, and the density at the orbit of satellites up to about 1,000 km (600 mi) increases significantly. This results in increased drag, causing satellites to slow and change orbit slightly. Low Earth orbit satellites that are not repeatedly boosted to higher orbits slowly fall and eventually burn up. Skylab's 1979 destruction is an example of a spacecraft reentering Earth's atmosphere prematurely as a result of higher-than-expected solar activity. During the great geomagnetic storm of March 1989, four of the U.S. Navy's navigational satellites had to be taken out of service for up to a week, the U.S. Space Command had to post new orbital elements for over 1000 objects affected, and the Solar Maximum Mission satellite fell out of orbit in December the same year.

The vulnerability of the satellites depends on their position as well. The South Atlantic Anomaly is a perilous place for a satellite to pass through, due to the unusually weak geomagnetic field at low Earth orbit.

==== Pipelines ====
Rapidly fluctuating geomagnetic fields can produce geomagnetically induced currents in pipelines. This can cause multiple problems for pipeline engineers. Pipeline flow meters can transmit erroneous flow information and the corrosion rate of the pipeline can be dramatically increased.

=== Radiation hazards to humans ===
Earth's atmosphere and magnetosphere allow adequate protection at ground level, but astronauts are subject to potentially lethal radiation poisoning. The penetration of high-energy particles into living cells can cause chromosome damage, cancer and other health problems. Large doses can be immediately fatal. Solar protons with energies greater than 30 MeV are particularly hazardous.

Solar proton events can also produce elevated radiation aboard aircraft flying at high altitudes. Although these risks are small, flight crews may be exposed repeatedly, and monitoring of solar proton events by satellite instrumentation allows exposure to be monitored and evaluated, and eventually flight paths and altitudes to be adjusted to lower the absorbed dose.

Ground level enhancements, also known as ground level events or GLEs, occur when a solar particle event contains particles with sufficient energy to have effects at ground level, mainly detected as an increase in the number of neutrons measured at ground level. These events have been shown to have an impact on radiation dosage, but they do not significantly increase the risk of cancer.

=== Animals ===
There is a large body of peer-reviewed scientific literature on connections between geomagnetic storms and human health. This began with Russian papers. The subject was subsequently studied by Western scientists, including N.O.A.A. associated scientists in the United States. Potential health impacts of geomagnetic storms include the involvement of cryptochrome, melatonin, the pineal gland, and the circadian rhythm.

Some scientists suggest that solar storms induce whales to beach themselves. Some have speculated that migrating animals using magnetoreception to navigate might also be affected. One example: Birds and honey bees.

== See also ==
- Advanced Composition Explorer
- Electromagnetic pulse
- List of solar storms
- Magnetar
- Solar and Heliospheric Observatory
- STEREO
- Van Allen Probes
- Miyake event
