= Solar energetic particles =

High-energy particles from the Sun

This visualization of particle acceleration across a shock is a simplified representation of shock drift acceleration showing the motion of electrons (yellow) and protons (blue).

Animation of NASA's STEREO coronagraph during a coronal mass ejection followed by solar energetic particles

Solar energetic particles (SEP), formerly known as solar cosmic rays, are high-energy, charged particles originating in the solar atmosphere and solar wind. They consist of protons, electrons and heavy ions with energies ranging from a few tens of keV to many GeV. The exact processes involved in transferring energy to SEPs is a subject of ongoing study.

SEPs are relevant to the field of space weather, as they are responsible for SEP events and ground level enhancements.

== History ==
SEPs were first detected in February and March 1942 by Scott Forbush indirectly as ground level enhancements.

== Solar particle events ==
SEPs are accelerated during solar particle events. These can originate either from a solar flare site or by shock waves associated with coronal mass ejections (CMEs). However, only about 1% of CMEs produce strong SEP events.

Two main mechanisms of acceleration are possible: diffusive shock acceleration (DSA, an example of second-order Fermi acceleration) or the shock-drift mechanism. SEPs can be accelerated to energies of several tens of MeV within 5–10 solar radii (5% of the Sun–Earth distance) and can reach Earth in a few minutes in extreme cases. This makes prediction and warning of SEP events quite challenging.

In March 2021, NASA reported that scientists had located the source of several SEP events, potentially leading to improved predictions in the future.

== Research ==
SEPs are of interest to scientists because they provide a good sample of solar material. Despite the nuclear fusion occurring in the core, the majority of solar material is representative of the material that formed the Solar System. By studying SEP's isotopic composition, scientists can indirectly measure the material that formed the Solar System.

== See also ==
- Solar wind
