= John Alexander Simpson =

American physicist and science educator

- Born: November 3, 1916; Portland, Oregon, U.S.
- Died: August 31, 2000 (aged 83); Chicago, Illinois, U.S.
- Citizenship: United States
- Education: Reed College; New York University
- Known for: founder of the Bulletin of the Atomic Scientists
- Awards: Gagarin Medal (1986); Bruno Rossi Prize (1991); Arctowski Medal (1993); Leo Szilard Lectureship Award (1999); William Bowie Medal (2000)
- Scientific career
- Fields: Physics
- Workplaces: University of Chicago
- Thesis: Reduction of the natural insensitive time in Geiger–Müller counters (1944)
- Doctoral advisor: Serge Alexander Korff
- Doctoral students: Sam Treiman; Edward C. Stone; Brian Cartwright; James J. Beatty

John Alexander Simpson (November 3, 1916 – August 31, 2000) was an American physicist and science educator. He was deeply committed to educating the public and political leaders about science and its implications, most notably as a principal founder of the Bulletin of the Atomic Scientists and a long-time member of the organization's board of sponsors.

He is known for inventions such as the gas flow α-particle proportional counter (for measuring plutonium yields in the presence of high intensity fission products), and the neutron monitor, and for having several of the instruments he created launched into space, such a dust flux monitor aboard the Stardust spacecraft.

Simpson spent his career as an instructor and researcher for the University of Chicago's Enrico Fermi Institute and Department of Physics, where he conducted experiments in nuclear physics and with cosmic rays. His research continued up until a few weeks prior to his death. He died of pneumonia which he contracted in the hospital following a successful heart surgery. The year he died, his instruments in space had been sending data back for nearly 40 years.

== Early life ==
Born in Portland, Oregon, Simpson was an accomplished clarinetist and saxophonist in his early years, receiving an award in high school for his virtuosity. He received an AB degree from Reed College in 1940, where he became interested in the history of science and technology from the Greeks to the Middle Ages to the most recent discoveries in astronomy and physics. He obtained an MS from New York University in 1943, and a Ph.D. a year later. It was at New York University in 1943 when Simpson was invited to be employed at University of Chicago. Volney Wilson, an administrator at the university's Metallurgical Laboratory asked him to help invent instruments for measuring high levels of radioactivity. It took much convincing, but Simpson finally agreed to help.

== Research ==
Simpson began his professional career as a physicist in 1943 where he acted as a group leader on the Manhattan Project. The Manhattan Project was the codename for a United States project with the United Kingdom and Canada conducted during World War II to develop the first atomic bombs. It was common for governments to recruit physicists during World War II for such tasks. Simpson had taken up the offer after recognizing the social and human implications of nuclear energy and wanted to partake in its development. Because of this, Simpson became a founding member and first chairman of the Atomic Scientists of Chicago in August 1945, a day after the United States dropped the atomic bomb on Hiroshima and two years after the start of his career. He was also a co-founder that same year of the Bulletin of the Atomic Scientists. The bulletin's aim was to spell out the implications of the atomic bomb and provide rational courses of action in response to the implications. In the October 29, 1945, issue of Life, Simpson, along with Eugene Rabinowitch, spoke about their involvement with nuclear energy, and said that scientists for the first time had recognized a moral responsibility to warn of the danger of any further use of nuclear weapons. Simpson felt that scientists and engineers could no longer remain aloof from the consequences of their work.

This same year Simpson began his tenure as a faculty member at the University of Chicago as a physics instructor, and remained there throughout his career, partaking in research until shortly before his death in August 2000. In 1945, he also worked as an unofficial adviser to Connecticut Senator Brien McMahon after taking a leave of absence from the university. As part of the university faculty, Simpson invented and patented a "gas flow α-particle proportional counter for measuring plutonium yields in the presence of high intensity fission products" by piping the plutonium-bearing gas through the counter itself.

Simpson has 15 patents under his name, which include the multiwire proportional counter, a device that improves accuracy and reading speed of radiation, and the neutron monitor. Nancy Farley Wood worked with Simpson and is credited with the development and production of the radiation detectors for the laboratory.

Simpson was a pioneer in the study of cosmic rays. Beginning in 1946 with investigations into cosmic ray neutrons in the lower atmosphere (developed from pre-World War II work by Serge Korff), he contributed significantly throughout the years to the field's development with his scientific investigations. Simpson's contributions were unique in that he accomplished his work in a way that boosted the accomplishments and careers of others around him. In 1955, he gave Eugene N. Parker a job as a research associate in the Enrico Fermi Institute of the University of Chicago, and his progress was largely a consequence of Simpson's continued support. In 1949, Simpson contributed to the discovery that the latitude effect seen with neutrons is around 20 times greater than with ionization chambers; in 1951, he found that the time variations are much greater as well. He had recognized the potential of neutrons and lower energy cosmic ray particles for exploring the causes of the time variations. That year he also invented the neutron monitor to fulfill the need for a stable ground-based neutron detector. In doing so, he established neutron monitor stations at various locations including Huancayo, Peru; Mexico City, Mexico; Sacramento Peak, New Mexico; Climax, Colorado; and Chicago, Illinois.

In 1954 and 1955, Simpson explored the global and time variations of cosmic rays at these neutron monitor stations around the world. In 1956, a giant cosmic ray flare provided the first direct glimpse of composition of interplanetary space. At this point, the scientific community surrounding cosmic rays and solar activity had grown large. Simpson was one of 12 scientists responsible for organizing and coordinating the International Geophysical Year (1957–58), helping to make it a huge success.

At the end of 1957, after the launch of Sputnik by the Soviet Union, Simpson, realizing the necessity for the US to send instruments into space, outlined the scientific situation and his plans for such activity to University Chancellor Lawrence Kimpton. Kimpton granted Simpson $5,000 to get the project off the ground, and partnered with Peter Meyer to develop small lightweight particle detectors suited for the space environment. Simpson's first particle detector was launched in 1958 on the spacecraft Pioneer 2.

In 1962, Simpson and Professor Peter Meyer established the Laboratory for Astrophysics and Space Research (LASR) which was built within the Enrico Fermi Institute at the University of Chicago. NASA contributed towards the laboratory and funded a building for LASR, which was completed in 1964. In the laboratory, instrument development and space research were consolidated under one roof, along with theoretical research connected with the results of the ongoing research and space experiments.

In 1965, Simpson, along with his students and co-workers, built the first cosmic ray detectors to visit Mars. It also became the first to visit Jupiter (in 1973), Mercury (1974) and Saturn (1979). Jupiter's mission detected the relativistic (3-30 MeV) electron population the planet was emitting for the first time; electrons were observed within the Jovian magnetosphere and then escaping at distances of at least 1 AU. Simpson's detection in 1974 is what first established that the magnetic fields observed at Mercury were not carried from the Sun by solar wind, but in fact belonged to the planet itself. Simpson had been helping to develop the mission from concept since 1959. Also, in 1980, his detection of a tiny gap in the distribution of energetic particles trapped in the magnetic field of Saturn indicated the presence of a previously undetected small moon orbiting at that position in space and absorbing particles which would otherwise be found. Subsequently, scientists identified Saturn's moon optically. In 1976 and 1982, Simpson also detected bursts of energetic particles associated with the passage of shock waves in the solar wind, and provided evidence that the transition serves as an efficient accelerator of particles.

In 1970, Simpson, William Dietrich, and John David Anglin discovered that some impulsive sun flares produce energetic particles, among which helium-3 (a light non-radioactive isotope of helium with two protons and one neutron) is at least ten times more abundant than helium-4 (another light non-radioactive isotope of helium with two protons and two neutrons). On Earth, helium-4 makes up about 99.986% of total helium. In 1973, his instruments on Pioneer 10 and Pioneer 11 indicated a cosmic ray intensity increase of about 1 percent per AU. In 1975, he found that during the low point of activity three years prior, the abundance of cosmic ray helium was strangely enhanced at these very low energies, as opposed to it dropping off with declining energies like protons do toward zero energy.

In 1975 and 1977, Simpson discovered that beryllium-10 nuclei are scarce in cosmic rays, and that this scarcity indicates that they have been around for about 2 × 10^{7} years. This led him to conclude that cosmic rays pass freely between the gaseous disk and the extended magnetic halo portion of the galaxy, where the ambient gas density is on the order of 10^{−2} atoms/cm^{3} or less.

In the 1980s, Simpson and A. J. Tuzzolino developed a dust flux monitor for the Stardust spacecraft. The instrument involved a thin sheet of plastic that was polymerized in the presence of a strong electric field perpendicular to the plane of the plastic, and then electrically polarized carrying a positive electric charge on one of its surfaces and a negative charge on the other. When a dust particle or heavy nucleus penetrated the sheet, it vaporized a small area, releasing the charges on the sheet and creating an electrical signal which indicated the location and size of the hole in the plastic; precise calibration allowed information about the collision, such as particle speed and size, to be extracted from the signal. These calibrations took place from 1985 until 1989. This device was used on Vega 1 and Vega 2 spacecraft to Halley's Comet in 1986, and earned him the Gagarin Medal for Space Exploration that year for his contribution towards the success of the Vega mission, as his instruments had been the only ones from the United States to encounter the comet.

== Accomplishments ==
John Alexander Simpson is known for inventions such as the "gas flow α-particle proportional counter", which measures plutonium yields in the presence of high intensity fission products, and the neutron monitor. His obituary in The Guardian noted that he was one of the most prolific inventors of scientific instruments for space exploration. The first of his instruments launched into space occurred in 1958; the last two were launched in 1999, one aboard the spacecraft Ulysses and the other aboard Stardust.

In 1959, Simpson was elected to the National Academy of Sciences. In 1968, he held the first Ryerson Chair and was made Distinguished Service Professor at the University of Chicago; in 1974, he was the first to be appointed to the Compton Chair, and in 1986 he became Emeritus.

Simpson is the recipient of the 1986 Gagarin Medal for Space Exploration for his contribution towards the success of the Vega program, which sent satellites to Halley's Comet earlier that year. In 1991, he was awarded the Bruno Rossi Prize by the American Astronomical Society for his contributions towards high-energy astrophysics, and in 1993 was awarded the Arctowski Medal of the National Academy of Sciences. In 1999, he was awarded the Leo Szilard Lectureship Award for his role in educating scientists, members of the United States Congress, and the public on the importance of civilian control of nuclear policy and his critical efforts in planning and execution of the International Geophysical Year and the Ó Ceallaigh Medal for contributions to cosmic ray physics. In 2000, he was also additionally awarded the William Bowie Medal which is the highest award given by the American Geophysical Union, for his extensive explorations of the cosmic rays and other energetic particles which bombard Earth.

He was known an outstanding professor, having throughout the course of his academic career supervised the research of 34 doctoral students, many who are now leaders in the space sciences. He received the Quantrell Award for Excellence in Undergraduate Teaching. Simpson has also provided lectures to the public using funds in 1974 which came from his Compton Chair in an attempt to reach a larger audience with his research. In 1982, he also established and became the first chairman of the Universities Space Science Working Group in Washington, D.C., in order to represent the space science laboratories in their dealings with the US Congress and NASA.
