= Alice Graeme Korff =

American art critic (1904–1975)

Alice Graeme Korff (1904–1975) was an American art critic, trustee of the Corcoran Gallery of Art, and administrator for the Public Works of Art Project. Between 1936 and 1939, Korff worked at The Washington Post as an art critic. Her papers are held at the Archives of American Art.

Korff married Finnish-born American physicist Serge Alexander Korff in February 1937, though the couple divorced. They had two children.

Korff died of cancer on March 13, 1975.
