= Serge Alexander Korff =

Finnish-born American physicist

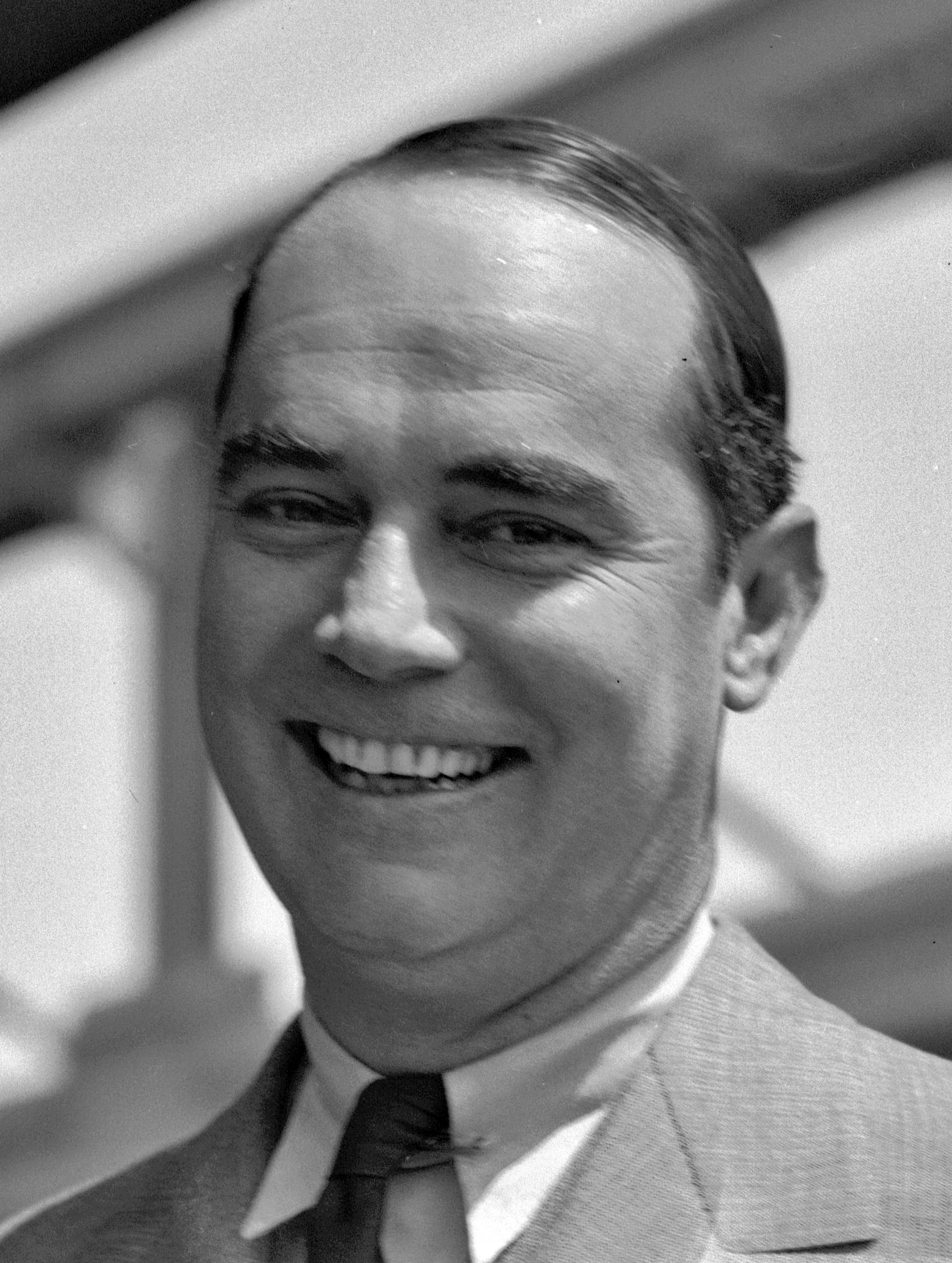
- Korff in 1930s
- Born: June 5, 1906; Helsinki, Grand Duchy of Finland
- Died: December 1, 1989 (aged 83); Manhattan, New York, US
- Education: Princeton University (B.A. (1928), M.A. (1929), and Ph.D. (1931))
- Known for: cosmic rays research
- Scientific career
- Fields: Physics
- Workplaces: New York University
- Doctoral students: John Alexander Simpson

Serge Alexander Korff (June 5, 1906 - December 1, 1989) was a Finnish-born American physicist and a pioneer of cosmic ray research. He invented the wire proportional counter particle detectors.

== Early life ==
Professor Serge Alexander Korff, Helsinki, 1917

Serge Alexander Korff was born at June 5, 1906 in Helsinki. His father, baron Serge Alexander Korff was an assistant of Governor-General of Finland, then part of the Russian Empire, and a professor of the Russian law at the University of Helsinki. His mother was an American, a "daughter of a retired Surgeon General and one time President of The American Red Cross". The family moved to the US after the Russian Revolution of 1917. In the United States, his father was on the faculty of Georgetown University, Johns Hopkins University and Columbia University. Writer Vladimir Nabokov was his cousin.

== Career ==
Korff got a B.A. (1928), M.A. (1929), and Ph.D. (1931) at Princeton University. He was a National Research Fellow at the Mount Wilson Observatory and the California Institute of Technology (1932 - 1935), a Research Fellow of the Bartol Research Foundation of the Franklin Institute (1936 - 1940). Korff joined the Physics Department of New York University in 1941, became a professor in 1945 and retired Emeritus in 1973.

He wrote over 175 papers, a fundamental nuclear instrument treatise, Electron and Nuclear Counters (Van Nostrand, 1946, 1955) and revised a textbook Electron and Nuclear Physics written initially by J. B. Hoag (Van Nostrand, 1948). He also served as a scientific reporter and editor. He developed the wire proportional counter particle detector, that are used for neutron detection. Physicist Willard Libby, who received the 1960 Nobel Prize for radioactive carbon dating, acknowledged his debt to Serge Korff in his Nobel lecture.

In 1940s-1950s, Korff led the teams that monitored cosmic rays using balloons, aircraft and mountaintop observatories. In The New York Times obituary his contributions are described as "observing and mapping the rain of neutrons ... produced by high energy radiation, or cosmic rays, striking the top of the atmosphere all over the earth. Balloon observations were made above Guam, the Galapagos Islands, Greenland, the Caribbean and several points within the United States". He made observations from Peru, Chacaltaya in Bolivia, the Galapagos, Mount Wrangell in Alaska, Greenland, and other areas.

Nobel laureate Frederick Reines worked with Korff as a student.

== Personal life ==
Korff was married three times: to American art critic Alice Graeme (divorced, two daughters Alexandra Scott and Alice Boardman), to Betty Hurd Renshaw (died in 1975), and to Marcella Heron.

He died at December 1, 1989, at home in Manhattan.

== Awards and honors ==
- Chevalier of the Legion of Honor (1952)
- The Curie Medal of the International Union Against Cancer (1955)
- Order of Cyprus (1959)
- Order of St. Denis of Xanthos (1965)
- fellow of the American Physical Society, American Geophysical Union, Royal Geographical Society and the AAAS.

He was President of the American Geographical Society (1966-1971), The Explorers Club (1955-1958 and 1961-1963) and the New York Academy of Sciences (1972).
