= Radiation assessment detector =

Radiation detection instrument on the Curiosity rover

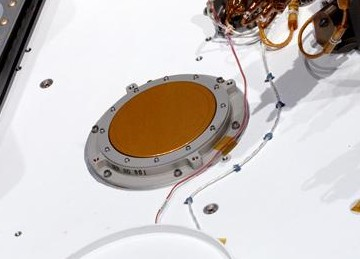
RAD in Curiosity

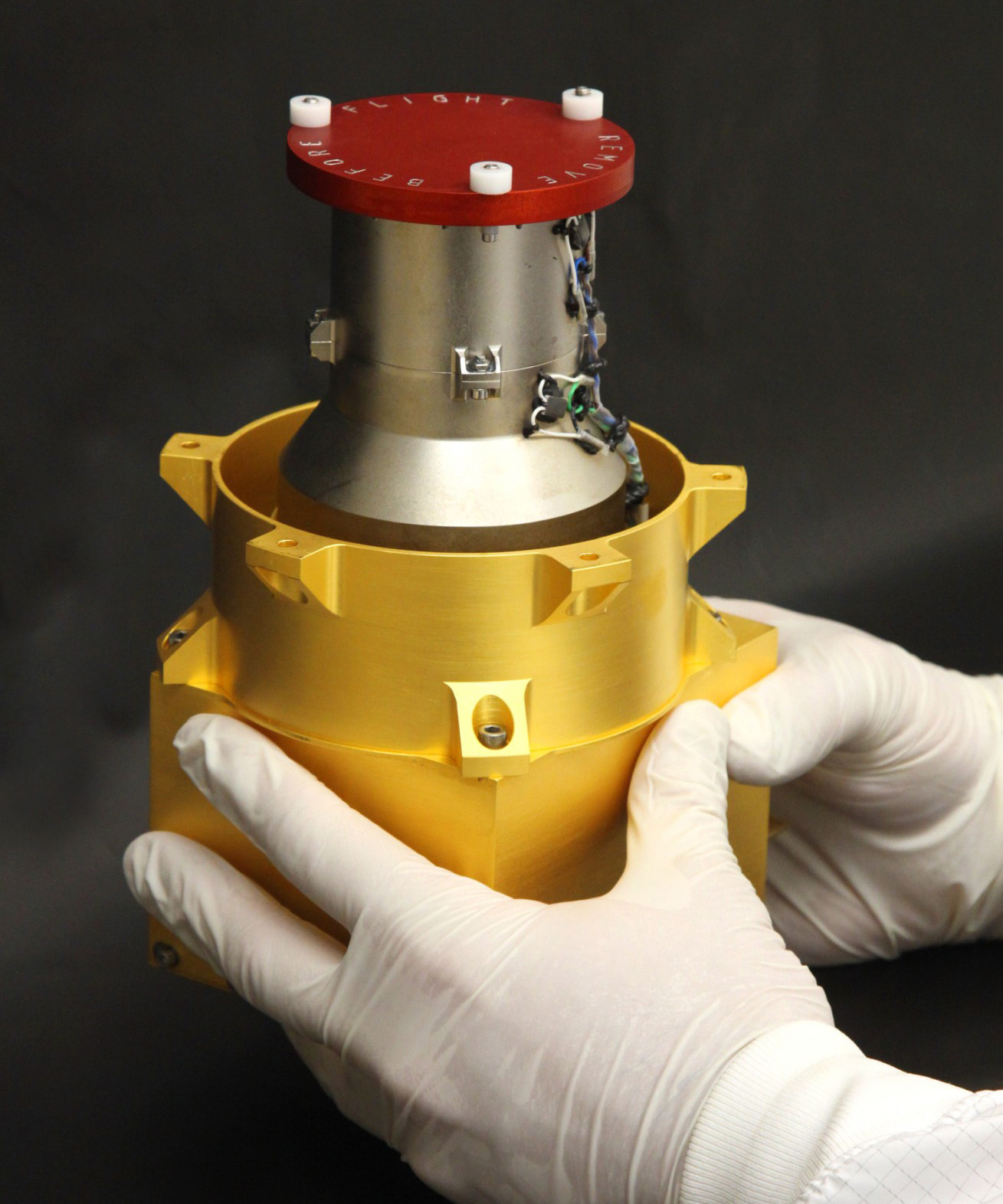
Radiation Assessment Detector on the Curiosity rover (Mars Science Laboratory)

The Radiation Assessment Detector (RAD) is an instrument mounted on the Mars Science Laboratory's Curiosity rover. It was the first of ten instruments to be turned on during the mission.

== Purpose ==
The first role of RAD was to characterize the broad spectrum of radiation environment found inside the spacecraft during the cruise phase. These measurements have never been done before from the inside of a spacecraft in interplanetary space. Its primary purpose is to determine the viability and shielding needs for potential human travelers on a human mission to Mars, as well as to characterize the radiation environment on the surface of Mars, which it started doing immediately after MSL landed in August 2012. Turned on after launch, the RAD recorded several radiation spikes caused by the Sun.

RAD is funded by the Exploration Systems Mission Directorate at NASA Headquarters and Germany's Space Agency (DLR), and developed by the Southwest Research Institute (SwRI) and the extraterrestrial physics group at Christian-Albrechts-Universität zu Kiel, Germany.

== Results ==
On 31 May 2013, NASA scientists reported the results obtained during cruise, and stated that the equivalent dose radiation for even the shortest round-trip with current propulsion systems and comparable shielding is found to be 0.66±0.12 sievert. This implies a great health risk caused by energetic particle radiation for any human mission to Mars.

In addition to assessing the radiation environment at Mars, data from RAD can also be used for the study of space weather. The arrival of coronal mass ejections at Mars can be detected in RAD data through the Forbush decreases that their passage causes in the Galactic cosmic radiation. These measurements have led to the finding that fast CMEs can continue to decelerate even beyond Earth orbit when dragged by slower surrounding solar wind.

In September 2017, NASA reported radiation levels on the surface of Mars were temporarily doubled, and were associated with an aurora 25-times brighter than any observed earlier, due to a massive, and unexpected, Solar particle event and associated solar storm in the middle of the month.

== Astrobiology ==
The radiation sources that are of concern for human health also affect microbial survival as well as the preservation of organic chemicals and biomolecules. The RAD is currently quantifying the flux of biologically hazardous radiation at the surface of Mars today, and will help determine how these fluxes vary on diurnal, seasonal, solar cycle and episodic (flare, storm) timescales. These measurements will allow calculations of the depth in rock or soil to which this flux, when integrated over long timescales, provides a lethal dose for known terrestrial microorganisms. Through such measurements, scientists can learn how deep below the surface life would have to be, or have been in the past, to be protected.

Research published in January 2014 of data from RAD, state that "ionizing radiation strongly influences chemical compositions and structures, especially for water, salts, and redox-sensitive components such as organic matter." The report concludes that the in situ "surface measurements —and subsurface estimates— constrain the preservation window for Martian organic matter following exhumation and exposure to ionizing radiation in the top few meters of the Martian surface.

== Gallery ==
Radiation doses - Mars trip/surface (MSL) (2011-2013)

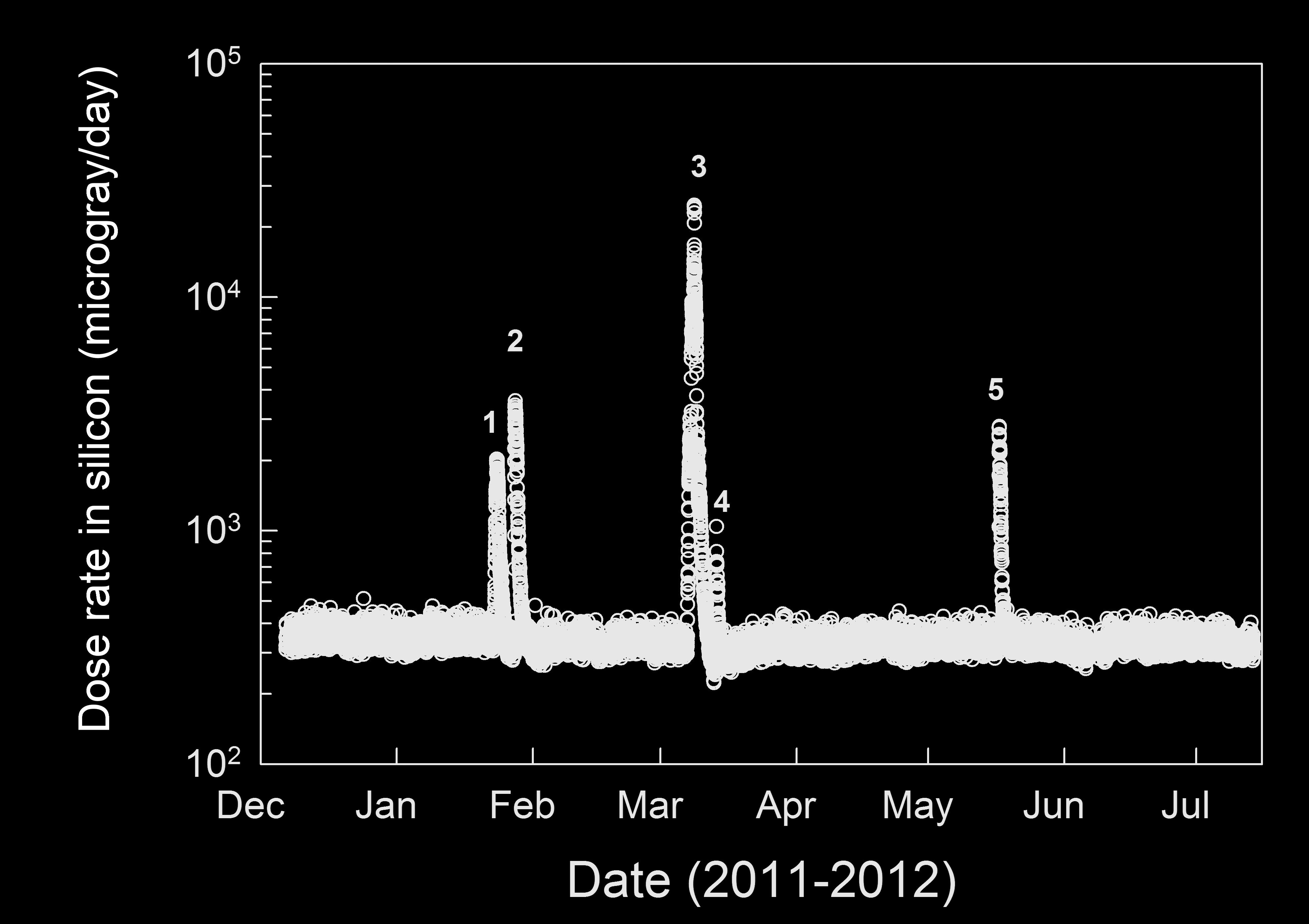
Radiation levels during trip from Earth to Mars (2011-2012)

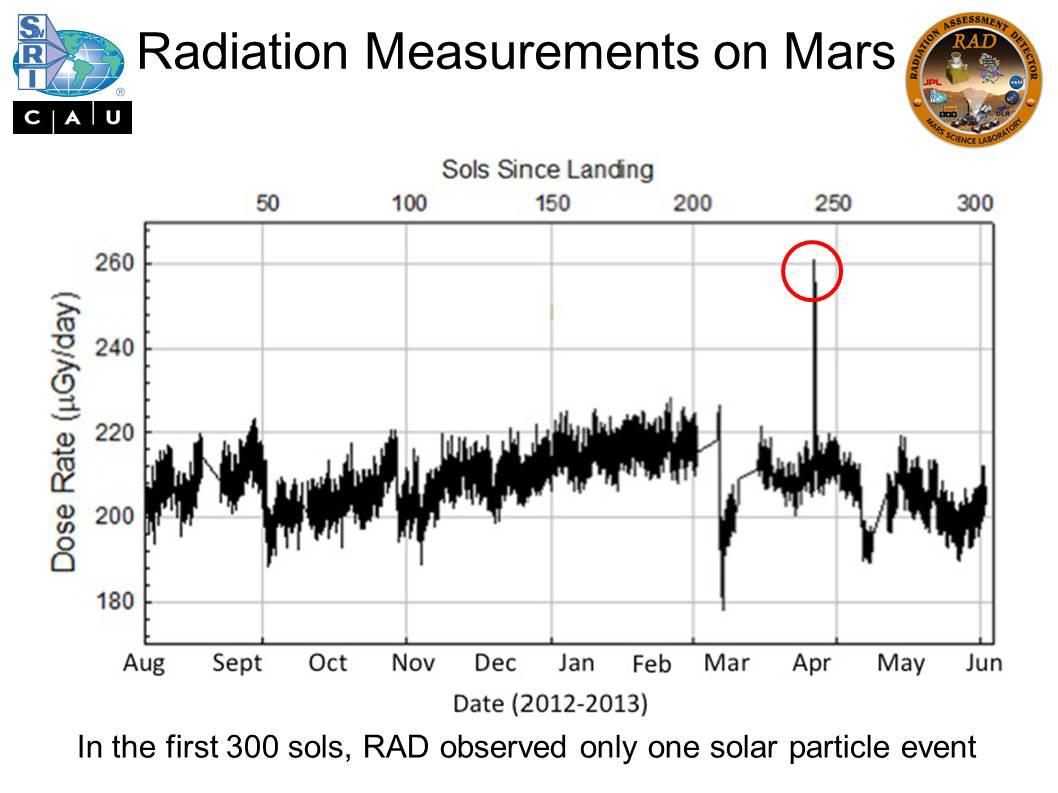
Radiation levels on the surface of Mars (2012-2013)

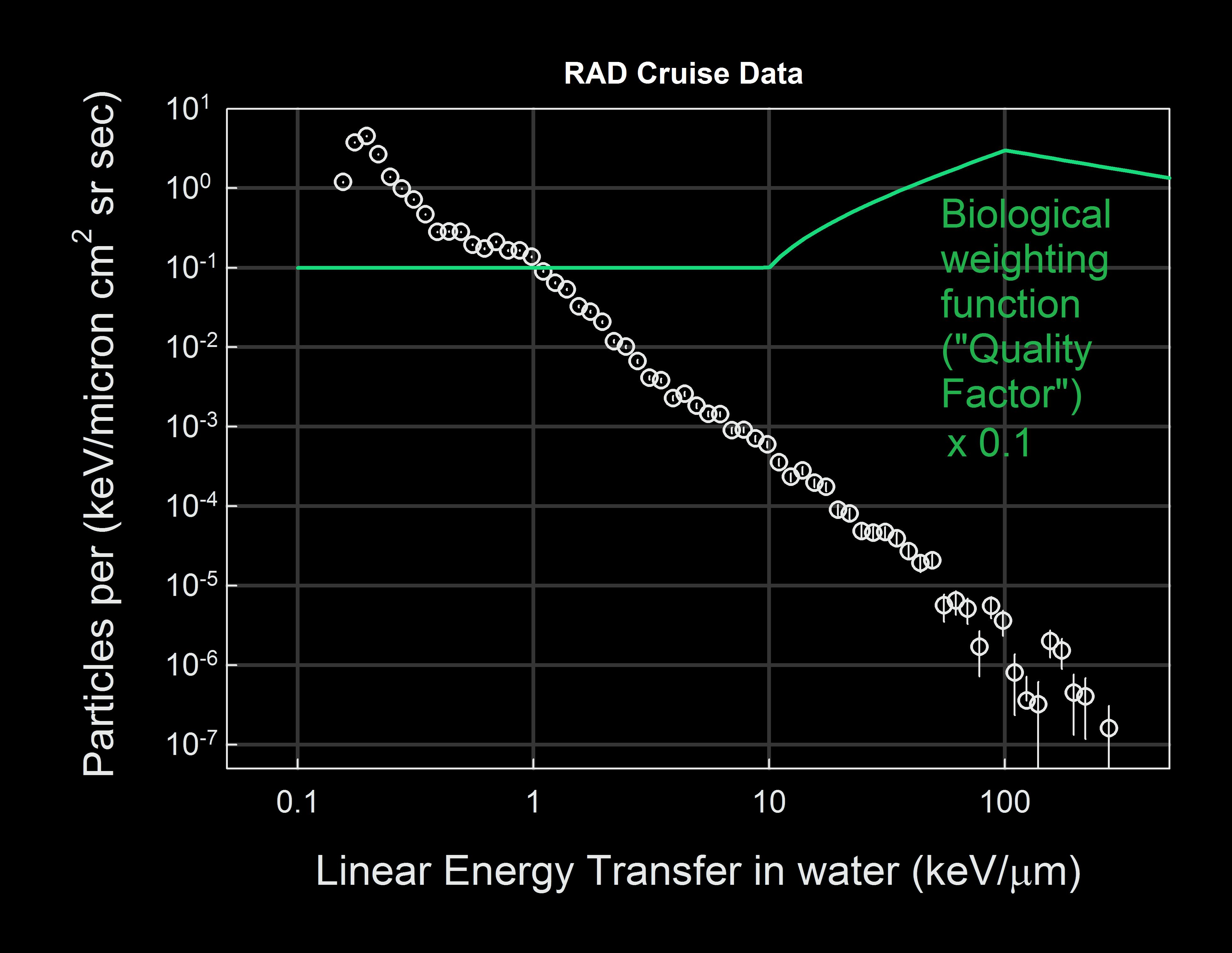
Calculating radiation dose for biological tissues

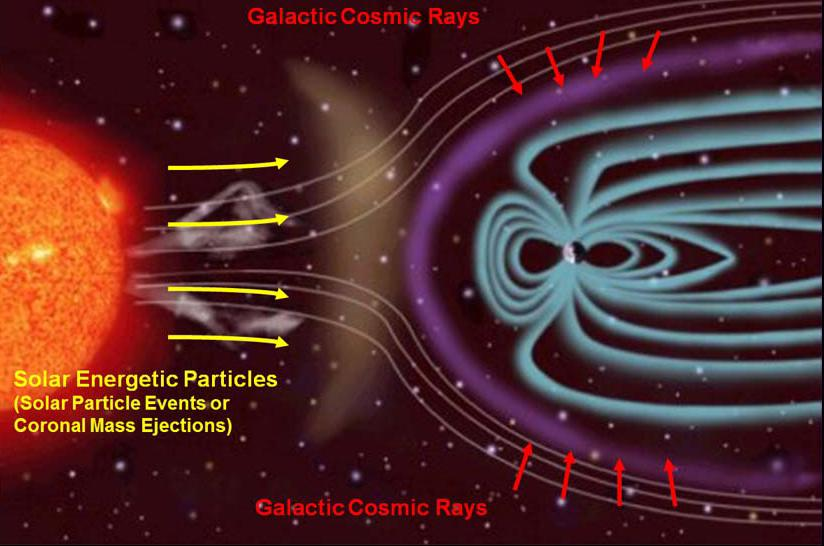
Sources of ionizing radiation in interplanetary space

== See also ==
- Cosmic ray
- Effect of spaceflight on the human body
- Exploration of Mars
- Health threat from cosmic rays
- Human mission to Mars
- Spaceflight radiation carcinogenesis
- Space medicine
- Timeline of Mars Science Laboratory
