= Nancy Farley Wood =

American mathematician

- Born: Nancy Lee Farley; July 12, 1903; La Monte, Missouri, U.S.
- Died: March 19, 2003 (aged 99); Baroda, Michigan, U.S.
- Education: Warrensburg Teacher's College; University of Chicago
- Employers: Metallurgical Laboratory; N. Wood Counter Laboratory
- Spouse: John Curtis Wood (m. 1928)
- Children: 6

Nancy Farley "Nan" Wood (12 July 1903 – 19 March 2003) was a physicist and businesswoman who was a member of the Manhattan Project. She was the only daughter of Daniel Lee Farley and Minerva Jane Ross, and a lifelong feminist and proponent of the Women's liberation movement as a founding member of the Chicago National Organization for Women. As a business owner, she designed, developed and manufactured her own line of ionizing radiation detectors. During World War II, Wood taught calculus to U.S. Navy sailors in Chicago. Later, during World War II, she was recruited to the Manhattan Project, where she designed and developed ionizing radiation detectors with John Alexander Simpson in the instrument division at the University of Chicago Metallurgical Laboratory or Met Lab. In 1949, Wood founded the N. Wood Counter Laboratory.

== Early life ==
Wood was born Nancy Lee Farley on a farm in 1903 at La Monte, Pettis County, Missouri and died in 2003 at the home of her son, William in Baroda, Berrien County, Michigan. Wood was the second child of four and the only daughter of Daniel Lee Farley and Minerva Jane Ross. In addition to her three brothers, she also had two half-brothers and a half-sister. In 1928, she married John Curtis Wood and the couple had 6 children, 5 of whom survived to adulthood. Nancy and John Curtis Wood and their daughter Shirley June (who died at the age of two) are buried at Green Ridge Cemetery in Green Ridge, Pettis County, Missouri.

== Education ==
Wood began her education in a one room schoolhouse in Green Ridge, Missouri. The family moved to central Missouri so she could attend college. Wood graduated from the Warrensburg Teacher's College and taught high school mathematics and physics. She attended the University of Chicago and in 1927 received a M.A. degree in education.

== World War II and the Manhattan Project ==
Prior to and during World War II, Wood taught calculus to U.S. Navy sailors in Chicago, Illinois. Toward the end of World War II she was recruited to the Manhattan Project where she designed and developed radiation detectors with John Alexander Simpson in the instrument division at the University of Chicago Metallurgical Laboratory or Met Lab.

== N. Wood Counter Laboratory ==
In 1949, Wood founded the N. Wood Counter Laboratory. The company was located atop the Hyde Park Bank building in Chicago. The company was established to develop, manufacture and supply gas-filled gamma radiation detectors and neutron radiation detectors. The customer base was research laboratories and universities engaged in the development of the peaceful utilization of atomic energy. The N. Wood Counter Laboratory company remained in business for over 50 years to supply a range of BF_{3} proportional neutron detectors, Geiger-Mueller detectors, proportional gamma counters and gas flow counters. In March 1994, Wood sold the company to her daughter, Marjory Wood Crawford.

In 1957, during the International Geophysical Year, the N. Wood model G-15-34A neutron detectors (Simpson Counters) were utilized to collect data worldwide.

=== NASA satellite programs ===
NASA chose the N. Wood Counter Laboratory G-5-3 neutron detectors to be deployed as the initial detectors to operate in the polar orbiting satellites. The N. Wood Counter Laboratory D-5-3L gamma detectors orbited in satellites as part of the following NASA satellite programs:

- Pioneer V mission.
- Discoverer or Corona satellite missions.
- Explorers program.
- Mariner program.
- Ranger program.

=== Patent credits ===
- Chlorine logging system using neutron capture gamma rays. U.S. Patent No. 3,244,882.
- Production of chemistry-dependent gamma ray and thermal neutron logs corrected for porosity. U.S. Patent 3,435,217.
- Radioactive well logging system having a multiple conductor cable. U.S. Patent 3,439,165.
- Method for chlorine logging wherein both chlorine and calcium are logged using a plurality of select narrow windows. U.S. Patent 3,484,609.

=== Works cited, credits for use of N. Wood Counter Laboratory detectors ===
- Fowler, W. B. (1950). Altitude Dependence of Neutron Production by Cosmic-Ray Particles. Physical Review. 79(1): 178.
- Martin Jr, Don S., Erling N. Jensen, Francis J. Hughes, and R. T. Nichols. (1951). Radiations from Yb-169. Physical Review. 82(5): 579.
- Hall, N. F., & Johns, D. H. (1953). The Separation of Technetium from Molybdenum, Cobalt and Silver. Journal of the American Chemical Society. 75(23): 5787–5791.
- Snowdon, S. C., & Whitehead, W. D. (1953). The Total Neutron Cross Sections of Gold, Chlorine, and Phosphorus. Physical Review. 90(4): 615.
- Ortel, William C.G. (1954). Neutron Production by Cosmic Rays. Physical Review. 93(3): 561.
- Macklin, R. L. (1957). Graphite sphere neutron detector. Nuclear Instruments.1(6): 335–339.
- Mosburg, Jr., Earl R. (1959). Scintillation Counter Method of Intercomparing Neutron Source Strengths by Means of a Manganous Sulfate Bath. Journal of Research of the National Bureau of Standards. 62(5): 189.
- Lyon, W. S., & Macklin, R. L. (1959). Neutron activation at 195 KeV. Physical Review. 114(6): 1619.
- Raffle, J. F. (1959). Determination of absolute neutron flux by gold activation. Journal of Nuclear Energy. Part A. Reactor Science. 10(1): 8-13.
- Flournoy, P. A., Tickle, R. S., & Whitehead, W. D. (1960). Photo-neutron Cross Sections of Cobalt and Manganese. Physical Review. 120(4): 1424.
- Kiser, Robert W. (1960). Characteristic parameters of gas-tube proportional counters. Applied Scientific Research, Section B. 8(1): 183–200.
- Marion, J. B., Levesque, R. J. A., Ludemann, C. A., & Detenbeck, R. W. (1960). A Versatile, High Efficiency 4π Neutron Detector. Nuclear Instruments and Methods. 8(3): 297–303.
- DeVoe, James R. (1961). Radioactive Contamination of Materials Used in Scientific Research. National Academies of Science. National Research Council. Publication 895. Washington, D.C.
- Borchers, R. R., & Poppe, C. H. (1963). Neutrons from Proton Bombardment of Lithium. Physical Review. 129(6): 2679.
- Teranishi, E., Furubayashi, B., Michikawa, T., Kageyama, M., & Yura, O. (1964). A Paraffin-Moderated 4π-Neutron Detector. Japanese Journal of Applied Physics. 3(1): 36.
- Beckurts, K. H., & Wirtz, K. (1964). Standardization of Neutron Measurements. In Neutron Physics (pp. 296–312). Springer Berlin Heidelberg.
- Heertje, I., Delvenne, L., Nagel, W., & Aten, A. H. W. (1964). A search for fast neutron detectors without a threshold. Physica. 30(12): 2290–2294.
- Gibbons, J. H., & Macklin, R. L. (1965). Total Cross Section for Be-9 (α, n). Physical Review. 137(6B): B1508.
- Sokolova, Z. Y., & Chernyaev, V. B. (1968). Detector for low neutron fluxes. Atomic Energy. 25(3): 1018–1019.
- Pönitz, W. P. (1969). Experimental determination of the efficiency of the grey neutron detector. Nuclear Instruments and Methods. 72(1): 120–122.

== Feminism and women’s liberation ==
- Founding member, Chicago NOW, National Organization for Women
- Woman of the Year, Chicago NOW, 1977
- National secretary, NOW, National Organization for Women
- International Chairman, Status of Women, Zonta International

== Community service ==
- Save the Dunes Council, Indiana
- Member, Izaak Walton League
- Hyde Park business woman
