= James J. Beatty =

American physicist

Academic background
- Education: University of Chicago

Academic work
- Institutions: Ohio State University

James J. Beatty is a physicist specializing in experimental particle astrophysics. He is professor emeritus of physics at Ohio State University, where he was professor of physics and of astronomy from 2004 and served as chair of the Department of Physics from 2008 to 2016. His research focuses on the detection and analysis of cosmic rays, including nuclei, electrons, positrons, ultra-high-energy cosmic rays (UHECRs), and ultra-high-energy neutrinos. He has worked on balloon-borne instruments flown over North America and Antarctica, among them HEAT, CREAM and ANITA, and on the Pierre Auger Observatory in Argentina, for which he led development of the surface detector electronics. Before joining Ohio State, he held faculty positions at Boston University, Washington University in St. Louis and Pennsylvania State University.

== Education ==
Beatty studied at the University of Chicago, where he earned an A.B. in chemistry in 1982 with special honors in chemistry and general honors in the College. While an undergraduate, he worked from 1980 to 1982 as a junior research technician in the university's Department of Chemistry. He then completed an S.M. in physics in 1984 and a Ph.D. in physics in 1986. As a graduate student he was a research assistant (1982–1985) in the Laboratory for Astrophysics and Space Research of the Enrico Fermi Institute, and after completing his Ph.D. he was a research associate there in 1986.

== Career ==
Beatty joined Boston University in 1986 as an assistant research professor of physics and became an assistant professor of astronomy and physics in 1989. In 1991 he moved to Washington University in St. Louis as an assistant professor in the Department of Physics and the McDonnell Center for the Space Sciences, and was promoted to associate professor in 1994. He joined Pennsylvania State University in 1995 as an associate professor in the departments of Physics and of Astronomy and Astrophysics, becoming a full professor in 2001. In 2001–02 he was a visiting scientist at the Bartol Research Institute of the University of Delaware.

In 2004 Beatty moved to Ohio State as professor of physics and professor of astronomy. He became chair of the Department of Physics in 2008 and held the post for eight years; Brian Winer succeeded him in 2016. He is a member of the university's Center for Cosmology and AstroParticle Physics (CCAPP). His doctoral students include Kimberly Palladino, who completed her Ph.D. under his supervision in 2009 with a thesis on the ANITA-I limit on neutrinos from gamma-ray bursts and is now a professor of physics at the University of Oxford, and Terri Brandt, who completed her Ph.D. under his supervision in 2009 and held senior roles at NASA, including deputy chief scientist of the Physics of the Cosmos Program Office at the Goddard Space Flight Center, before becoming head of the astrophysics program at SRON Space Research Organisation Netherlands in 2023.

== Research ==
=== Cosmic-ray isotopes ===
Beatty's early work concerned the isotopic composition of light cosmic-ray nuclei. With Moisés García-Muñoz and John A. Simpson, he published a study of the spectra of cosmic-ray hydrogen and helium isotopes as a test of the origin of the excess hydrogen flux observed at solar minimum, and in 1986 he published a single-author paper in The Astrophysical Journal that developed a self-consistent model of the interstellar propagation of galactic cosmic rays based on the isotopes of hydrogen and helium. He was lead author of a 1993 study using the Superconducting Magnet Instrument for Light Isotopes (SMILI), a balloon payload flown for 19 hours on September 1, 1989, that measured about 30,000 cosmic-ray helium nuclei. The measured ratio of helium-3 to helium-4 was consistent with interstellar propagation models, in contrast to earlier observations that had suggested an overabundance of helium-3.

=== Cosmic-ray antimatter ===
Beatty was a member of the collaboration that built the High-Energy Antimatter Telescope (HEAT), a balloon-borne instrument that uses a superconducting magnet spectrometer to separate positive and negative particles. HEAT was first flown in May 1994 from Fort Sumner, New Mexico, and measured the energy spectra of electrons and positrons from about 5 to 50 GeV. Its results did not show the significant rise in the positron fraction above about 10 GeV that earlier experiments had reported. Combined data from the first two flights, covering energies from about 1 to 50 GeV, also showed a slight enhancement in the positron fraction between about 7 and 20 GeV.

A later version of the instrument, HEAT-pbar, was flown from Fort Sumner on June 3, 2000, and identified 71 cosmic-ray antiprotons; their abundance relative to protons agreed with a purely secondary origin. Beatty was first author of the 2004 Physical Review Letters paper reporting HEAT-pbar's measurement of the positron fraction between 5 and 15 GeV, which, combined with the two earlier flights, indicated a small positron flux of non-standard origin above 5 GeV.

=== Direct measurements of high-energy nuclei ===
At Penn State, Beatty and Stéphane Coutu were responsible for the timing charge detector (TCD) of the Cosmic Ray Energetics And Mass (CREAM) balloon experiment, which used a timing technique developed by Beatty and colleagues. CREAM was designed to measure the elemental spectra of cosmic rays at energies just below the "knee" of the galactic cosmic-ray spectrum, near 10^{15} eV. Beatty was first author of a 2002 paper describing the TCD, which identifies the charge of an incoming particle by measuring the peak of its scintillator pulse within about 3 nanoseconds of the signal crossing a threshold, a method that overcomes interference from albedo particles produced in the instrument's calorimeter. His group continued this work after his move to Ohio State. CREAM was launched from McMurdo Station, Antarctica, on December 16, 2004, and flew for nearly 42 days, at the time a record for duration and distance for a scientific balloon.

=== Ultra-high-energy cosmic rays ===
At Penn State, Beatty was principal investigator, with Coutu as co-principal investigator, of a National Science Foundation award for the university's participation in the Auger project from 1999 to 2002. He led the development of the surface detector electronics for the Pierre Auger Observatory in Argentina, the world's largest cosmic-ray detector. A National Science Foundation award abstract describes the Ohio State group as having played a key role in the design, integration, commissioning and management of the surface detector electronics chain, and a leading role in developing its trigger and automated calibration. He was a co-author of the Auger Collaboration's 2007 paper in Science reporting a correlation between the arrival directions of cosmic rays with energies above 6×10^{19} eV and the positions of nearby active galactic nuclei. For the observatory's upgrade, AugerPrime, he presented a design for new surface detector electronics at the 2015 International Cosmic Ray Conference, as primary author with Tiina Suomijärvi; the design featured improved GPS timing, faster sampling, greater dynamic range and better calibration and monitoring.

=== Radio detection of neutrinos ===
Beatty is a member of the collaboration behind the Antarctic Impulsive Transient Antenna (ANITA), a NASA-funded long-duration balloon experiment that searches for radio pulses produced when ultra-high-energy neutrinos interact in the Antarctic ice sheet. He was a co-author of the 2004 report on ANITA-lite, a two-antenna prototype that circled Antarctica for 18 days during the 2003–04 season, and of the paper describing the full instrument's design and its first flight, completed in January 2007. Data from that flight included 16 cosmic-ray air showers detected through their radio emission, with a mean energy of 1.5×10^{19} eV; the 2010 report in Physical Review Letters described this as the first use of radio techniques at these energies. In 2016 Beatty and his ANITA colleagues reported an upward-pointing, cosmic-ray-like radio event from the first flight whose characteristics were consistent with a particle emerging from the ice; interpreting it as the decay of a tau lepton would require significant suppression of the Standard Model tau-neutrino cross section. ANITA has also set limits on the flux of neutrinos produced through the Greisen–Zatsepin–Kuzmin (GZK) process.

The Ohio State group's work on ANITA-III was featured in The Economist in December 2014. In December 2017 Beatty traveled to the Amundsen–Scott South Pole Station to help recover the ANITA-IV payload, which had been launched from McMurdo Station the previous December and had landed about 170 nautical miles from the station. He is an author of the white paper for ANITA's successor, the Payload for Ultrahigh Energy Observations (PUEO), a long-duration balloon experiment that the paper describes as designed to have world-leading sensitivity to neutrinos above 1 EeV. Beatty is PUEO's project manager; the experiment is led by the University of Chicago and funded by NASA. The instrument made its first flight from Antarctica in December 2025, operating for more than three weeks at an altitude of about 120,000 feet (37 km) before the flight ended on January 12, 2026. He also works on the Askaryan Radio Array (ARA) at the South Pole and on successor radio experiments in Greenland and Antarctica, and is a co-author of the design paper for the Radio Neutrino Observatory in Greenland (RNO-G), which seeks to detect neutrinos above 10 PeV.

=== IceCube and HELIX ===
Beatty also takes part in the IceCube Neutrino Observatory, which uses thousands of sensors in a cubic kilometer of Antarctic ice at the South Pole and has observed astrophysical neutrinos at TeV to PeV energies. As a member of the IceCube Collaboration, he co-authored the 2018 report in Science of a high-energy neutrino, IceCube-170922A, whose arrival direction coincided with the flaring blazar TXS 0506+056. He is working with the IceCube and radio-detection communities toward a next-generation neutrino observatory at the South Pole. He also works on the High Energy Light Isotope Experiment (HELIX), which studies how galactic cosmic rays are confined by measuring the abundance of the "clock" isotope beryllium-10.

== Service and advisory roles ==
In November 2016, NASA appointed Beatty to its Physics of the Cosmos Program Analysis Group (PhysPAG) Executive Committee, for a term running from December 2016 to December 2019. He represented the cosmic-ray science interest group on the committee. On his appointment he said he expected to help evaluate missions and technologies in cosmic-ray and neutrino astrophysics and related areas, and to help those communities discuss ideas for future NASA missions.

== Honors and awards ==
Beatty was awarded a Guggenheim Fellowship in 2001; the fellowship ran from July 2001 to June 2002. In 2009 he was made an Officer of the French Ordre des Palmes académiques, and in 2010 he received the National Science Foundation's Antarctica Service Medal. In 2012 he was elected a Fellow of the American Physical Society, on the nomination of its Division of Astrophysics, for contributions to cosmic-ray astrophysics, including leadership roles in the Pierre Auger Observatory, balloon-borne studies of cosmic-ray antiprotons and positrons, and radio searches for high-energy neutrinos. In 2017 he was elected a Fellow of the American Association for the Advancement of Science, for contributions to experimental particle astrophysics, particularly studies of ultrahigh-energy cosmic rays, neutrinos and antiparticles, and for service as an academic leader.

In April 2024 he was the Winstein Distinguished Visiting Fellow in the Department of Physics at the University of Chicago, where he gave a physics colloquium titled "Cosmic Rays and Cosmic Neutrinos in the 21st Century".

== Selected publications ==
- Beatty, J. J.; García-Muñoz, M.; Simpson, J. A. (1985). "The cosmic-ray spectra of ^{1}H, ^{2}H, and ^{4}He as a test of the origin of the hydrogen superfluxes at solar minimum modulation". The Astrophysical Journal. 294: 455–462. doi:10.1086/163311
- Beatty, J. J.; et al. (1993). "The cosmic-ray ^{3}He/^{4}He ratio from 100 to 1600 MeV/amu". The Astrophysical Journal. 413 (1): 268–280. doi:10.1086/172994
- Barwick, S. W.; Beatty, J. J.; et al. (1998). "The energy spectra and relative abundances of electrons and positrons in the galactic cosmic radiation". The Astrophysical Journal. 498: 779–789. doi:10.1086/305573
- Beach, A. S.; Beatty, J. J.; et al. (2001). "Measurement of the cosmic-ray antiproton-to-proton abundance ratio between 4 and 50 GeV". Physical Review Letters. 87 (27): 271101. doi:10.1103/PhysRevLett.87.271101
- Beatty, J. J.; et al. (2004). "New measurement of the cosmic-ray positron fraction from 5 to 15 GeV". Physical Review Letters. 93 (24): 241102. doi:10.1103/PhysRevLett.93.241102
- Pierre Auger Collaboration (2007). "Correlation of the highest-energy cosmic rays with nearby extragalactic objects". Science. 318 (5852): 938–943. doi:10.1126/science.1151124
- Hoover, S.; Beatty, J. J.; et al. (2010). "Observation of ultrahigh-energy cosmic rays with the ANITA balloon-borne radio interferometer". Physical Review Letters. 105 (15): 151101. doi:10.1103/PhysRevLett.105.151101
- Gorham, P. W.; Beatty, J. J.; et al. (2016). "Characteristics of four upward-pointing cosmic-ray-like events observed with ANITA". Physical Review Letters. 117 (7): 071101. doi:10.1103/PhysRevLett.117.071101
- IceCube Collaboration; et al. (2018). "Multimessenger observations of a flaring blazar coincident with high-energy neutrino IceCube-170922A". Science. 361 (6398): eaat1378. doi:10.1126/science.aat1378
- Abarr, Q.; Beatty, J. J.; et al. (2021). "The Payload for Ultrahigh Energy Observations (PUEO): a white paper". Journal of Instrumentation. 16 (8): P08035. doi:10.1088/1748-0221/16/08/P08035
