= Solar particle event =

Solar phenomenon

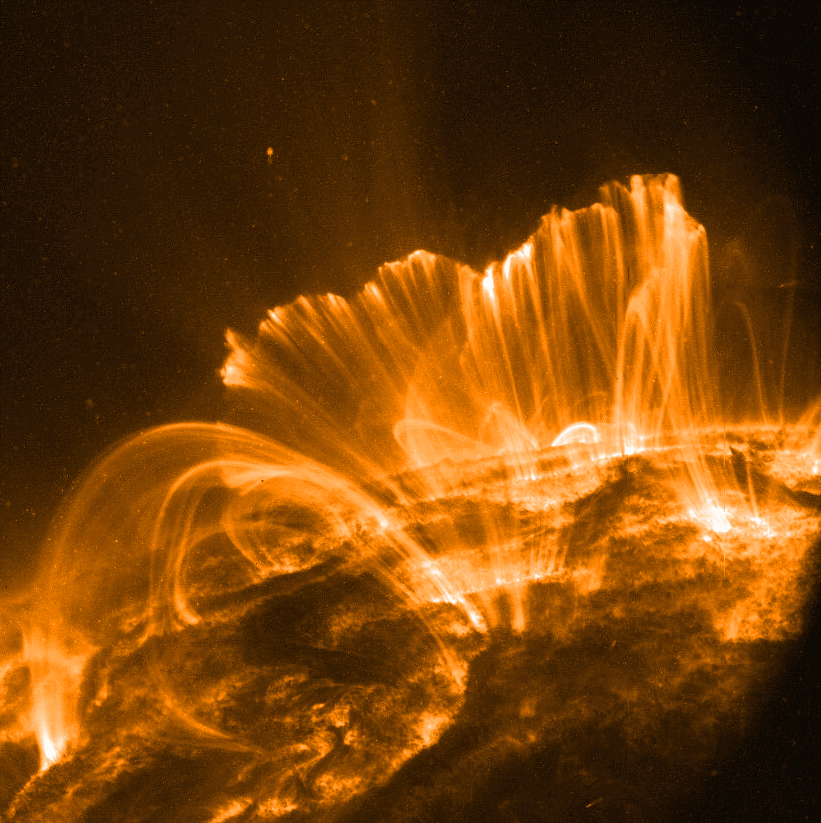
Post-eruptive loops in the wake of a solar flare, image taken by the TRACE satellite (photo by NASA)

A solar particle event (SPE), also known as a solar energetic particle event or solar radiation storm, (Note: Solar particle events are less commonly referred to as solar proton events and prompt proton events.) is a solar phenomenon that occurs when particles emitted by the Sun, mostly protons, become accelerated either in the Sun's atmosphere during a solar flare or in interplanetary space by a coronal mass ejection shock. Other nuclei such as helium and HZE ions may also be accelerated. These particles can penetrate the Earth's magnetic field and cause partial ionization of the ionosphere. Energetic protons are a significant radiation hazard to spacecraft and astronauts.

== Description ==
SPEs occur when charged particles in the Sun's atmosphere are accelerated to extremely high velocities. These charged particles, referred to as solar energetic particles, can escape into interplanetary space, where they follow the interplanetary magnetic field. When solar energetic particles interact with the Earth's magnetosphere, they are guided by the Earth's magnetic field towards the North and South poles where they can penetrate into the upper atmosphere.

The U.S. National Oceanic and Atmospheric Administration has a scale for solar radiation storms that ranges from S1 (minor) to S5 (extreme).

== Cause ==
The physical mechanism behind the acceleration of solar energetic particles leading up to SPEs is currently debated. However, SPEs can generally be divided into two classes based on their acceleration mechanisms.

=== Gradual events ===
Gradual SPEs are thought to involve the acceleration of particles by shocks driven by coronal mass ejections in the upper corona. They are associated with type II radio bursts and are characterized by elemental abundances, charge states, and temperatures similar to that of the ambient corona. These events produce the highest particle intensities near Earth.

=== Impulsive events ===
Impulsive SPEs are thought to involve the acceleration of particles mostly by processes associated with magnetic reconnection and wave-particle interactions at the locations of solar flares. They are associated with short-duration flare emissions at low altitudes and type III radio bursts. They are less intense near Earth than gradual events. An additional hybrid class has been identified which involves characteristics of both gradual and impulsive events.

== Terrestrial effects ==
Protons accelerated during an SPE normally have insufficient energy to penetrate the Earth's magnetic field. However, during unusually strong flares, protons can be accelerated to sufficient energies to reach the Earth's magnetosphere and ionosphere around the North Pole and South Pole.

=== Polar cap absorption events ===
Energetic protons that are guided into the polar regions collide with atmospheric constituents and release their energy through the process of ionization. The majority of the energy is deposited in the extreme lower region (D-region) of the ionosphere (around 50–80 km in altitude). This area is particularly important to ionospheric radio communications because this is the area where most of the absorption of radio signal energy occurs. The enhanced ionization produced by incoming energetic protons increases the absorption levels in the lower ionosphere and can have the effect of completely blocking all ionospheric radio communications through the polar regions. Such events are known as polar cap absorption events. These events commence and last as long as the energy of incoming protons at approximately greater than 10 MeV (million electron volts) exceeds roughly 10 pfu (particle flux units or particles sr^{−1} cm^{−2} s^{−1}) at geosynchronous satellite altitudes.

Polar cap absorption events and the associated HF radio blackout pose unique problems to commercial and military aviation. Routes that transit polar regions, especially above about 82-degrees north latitude, can only rely on HF radio communications. Hence, if polar cap absorption events are ongoing or forecast, commercial airlines are required to redirect their routes such that HF communications remain viable.

=== Ground level enhancements ===
Extremely intense SPEs capable of producing energetic protons with energies in excess of 200 MeV can increase neutron count rates at ground levels through secondary radiation effects. These rare events are known as ground level enhancements (GLEs). Presently, 77 GLE events are known. The strongest known GLE event was detected on 23 February 1956. Some events produce large amounts of HZE ions, although their contribution to the total radiation is small compared to the level of protons.

=== Miyake events ===
Solar particle events are thought to be responsible for Miyake events, observed sharp enhancements of the concentration of certain isotopes found in tree rings. These events, discovered by physicist Fusa Miyake, have enabled the dating of a number of past SPEs to specific years.

== Hazards ==
=== Humans ===
High altitude commercial transpolar aircraft flights have measured increases in radiation during these events. In 2019, the International Civil Aviation Organization introduced the Space Weather Centres that publish space weather advisories pertinent to international air navigation, describing the effects of space weather on aviation and possible mitigation actions. Aircraft flights away from the polar regions are far less likely to see an impact from SPEs.

Significant proton radiation exposure can be experienced by astronauts who are outside of the protective shield of the Earth's magnetosphere, such as an astronaut in-transit to, or located on, the Moon. However, the effects can be minimized if the astronauts are in a low Earth orbit and remain confined to the most heavily shielded regions of their spacecraft. Proton radiation levels in low Earth orbit increase with orbital inclination. Therefore, the closer a spacecraft approaches the polar regions, the greater the exposure to energetic proton radiation will be.

=== Spacecraft ===
Energetic protons from SPEs can electrically charge spacecraft to levels that can damage electronic components. They can also cause electronic components to behave erratically. For example, solid state memory on spacecraft can be altered, which may cause data or software contamination and result in unexpected (phantom) spacecraft commands being executed. Energetic proton storms also destroy the efficiency of the solar panels that are designed to collect and convert sunlight to electricity. During years of exposure to energetic proton activity from the Sun, spacecraft can lose a substantial amount of electrical power that may require important instruments to be turned off.

When energetic protons strike the sensitive optical electronics in spacecraft (such as star trackers and other cameras) flashes occur in the images being captured. The effect can be so pronounced that during extreme events, it is not possible to obtain quality images of the Sun or stars. This can cause spacecraft to lose their orientation, which is critical if ground controllers are to maintain control.

== Associated phenomena ==
Major SPEs can be associated with geomagnetic storms that can cause widespread disruption to electrical grids. However, proton events themselves are not responsible for producing anomalies in power grids, nor are they responsible for producing geomagnetic storms. Power grids are only sensitive to fluctuations in the Earth's magnetic field.

== See also ==
- Heliophysics
- List of solar storms
