= Ring current =

Magnetospheric phenomenon

A ring current is an electric current carried by charged particles trapped in a planet's magnetosphere. It is caused by the longitudinal drift of energetic (10–200 keV) particles.

== Earth ==
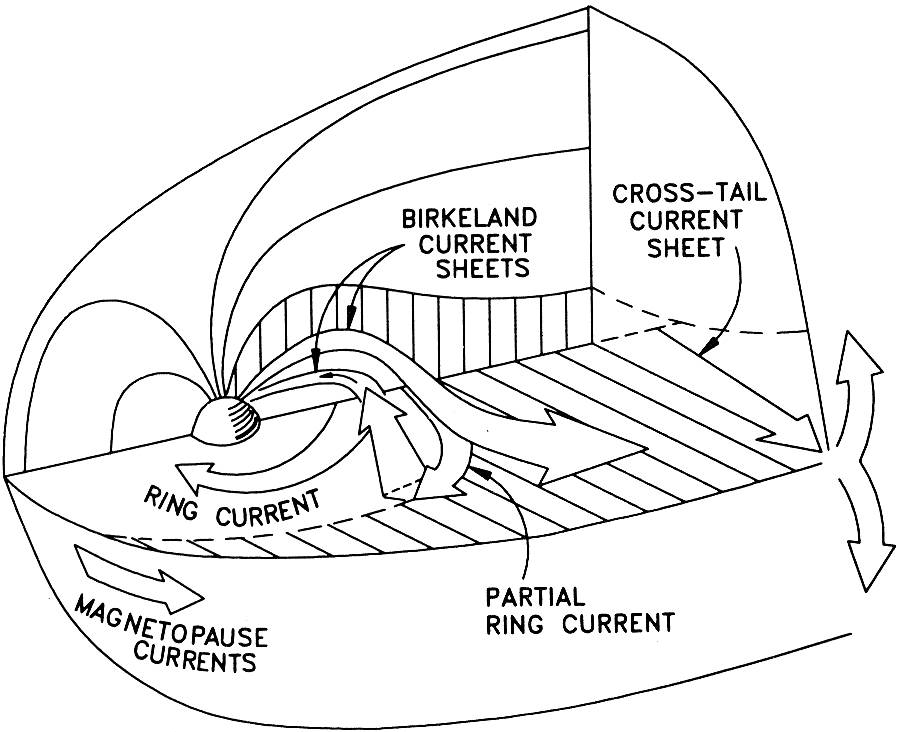
Schematic view of the different current systems which shape the Earth's magnetosphere.

The Earth's ring current is located at a geocentric distance of 3 to 8 R_{E} within the equatorial plane. It is primarily carried by ions, although low energy particles within the Van Allen radiation belts (which overlap with the ring current) also contribute to the ring current. Protons are the primary ion within the ring current, although O+ oxygen ions also contribute to the ring current. The positive and negative charged particles drift in opposite directions around the Earth to create a net charge transport and establish the current.

The ring current orientation is counterclockwise around the Earth when viewed from the north pole. The magnetic field induced by the ring current is oriented southward on the Earthward edge of the ring current. The induced magnetic field is therefore in the opposite direction to the Earth's geomagnetic field, which points in the northward direction.

The ring current can be significantly enhanced during geomagnetic storms as more particles are injected in to the ring current. A stronger ring current directly corresponds to a stronger induced magnetic field. If the ring current is sufficiently enhanced, ground-based magnetometers near the equator can measure a decrease in the net magnetic field. This causes the Dst index (which is derived from equatorial magnetic field observations) to become negative.

== See also ==
- Van Allen radiation belt
