= Ground level enhancement =

Solar phenomenon

A ground level enhancement (GLE), or ground level event, is a special subset of solar particle event where charged particles from the Sun have sufficient energy to generate effects which can be measured at the Earth's surface. These particles (mostly protons) are accelerated to high energies either within the solar atmosphere or in interplanetary space, with some debate as to the predominant acceleration method. While solar particle events typically involve solar energetic particles at 10–100 MeV, GLEs involve particles with energies higher than about 400 MeV.

== Definition ==
The definition of a GLE is as follows:

A GLE event is registered when there are near-time coincident and statistically significant enhancements of the count rates of at least two differently located neutron monitors including at least one neutron monitor near sea level and a corresponding enhancement in the proton flux measured by a space-borne instrument(s).

There is a subclass of GLEs called sub-GLE:

A sub-GLE event is registered when there are near-time coincident and statistically significant enhancements of the count rates of at least two differently located high-elevation neutron monitors and a corresponding enhancement in the proton flux measured by a space-borne instrument(s), but no statistically significant enhancement in the count rates of neutron monitors near sea level.

== Description ==
Charged particles from the Sun generally do not possess the energy required to penetrate the Earth's magnetic field or upper atmosphere. However, a small number of solar events produce charged particles which are able to penetrate these layers, causing an air shower. This particle shower reaches ground level, where effects are measured, leading to the name ground level enhancement. These effects are usually measured as elevated levels of neutrons and muons. These events can increase the radiation dose of an individual at sea level or while in an aircraft, though not by enough to significantly increase an individual's lifetime risk of cancer.

GLEs are distinct from individual cosmic rays because multiple charged particles enter the Earth's atmosphere simultaneously, leading to a synchronized event over a wide area. The term GLE refers to this wider event rather than an individual particle shower. A GLE is indicated by an increase in levels of neutrons and muons at one or more monitoring stations occurring over a period of 15 min or longer, followed by a longer decay to previous levels.

GLEs are associated with intense solar flares; for example, the GLE which occurred on May 17, 2012, was associated with an M-Class flare which occurred 20 minutes prior. As GLE-causing particles have such high kinetic energies, they travel very quickly and can be used to predict the arrival of lower-energy, slower particles originating from solar energetic particle events (SEPs). The method by which solar flares and coronal mass ejections (CMEs) produce such high-energy particles is still uncertain, with some studies suggesting that they are produced mostly by a CME shock wave, by strong flare events or some combination, or related to the connection between the active solar region and the magnetic field of the Earth.

When correlated with the S-scale for SEP events (related to the number of >10 MeV protons measured at geosynchronous orbit), GLE occurrence rate was 29% for S2 or larger storms, 36% for S3 or larger, and 40% for S4.

GLEs are uncommon. As of 27 November 2025, 77 GLE events have been observed since the 1940s. The most recent GLE #77 took place on 11 November 2025. GLEs are more frequent around solar maximum.

== See also ==
- Heliophysics
- List of solar storms
- Solar energetic particles
- Space weather
- Solar particle event
- Particle shower
- Air shower (physics)
