= Forbush decrease =

Decrease in cosmic ray intensity

A Forbush decrease is a rapid decrease in the observed galactic cosmic ray intensity following a coronal mass ejection (CME). It occurs due to the magnetic field of the plasma solar wind sweeping some of the galactic cosmic rays away from Earth. The term Forbush decrease was named after the American physicist Scott E. Forbush, who studied cosmic rays in the 1930s and 1940s.

== Observation ==
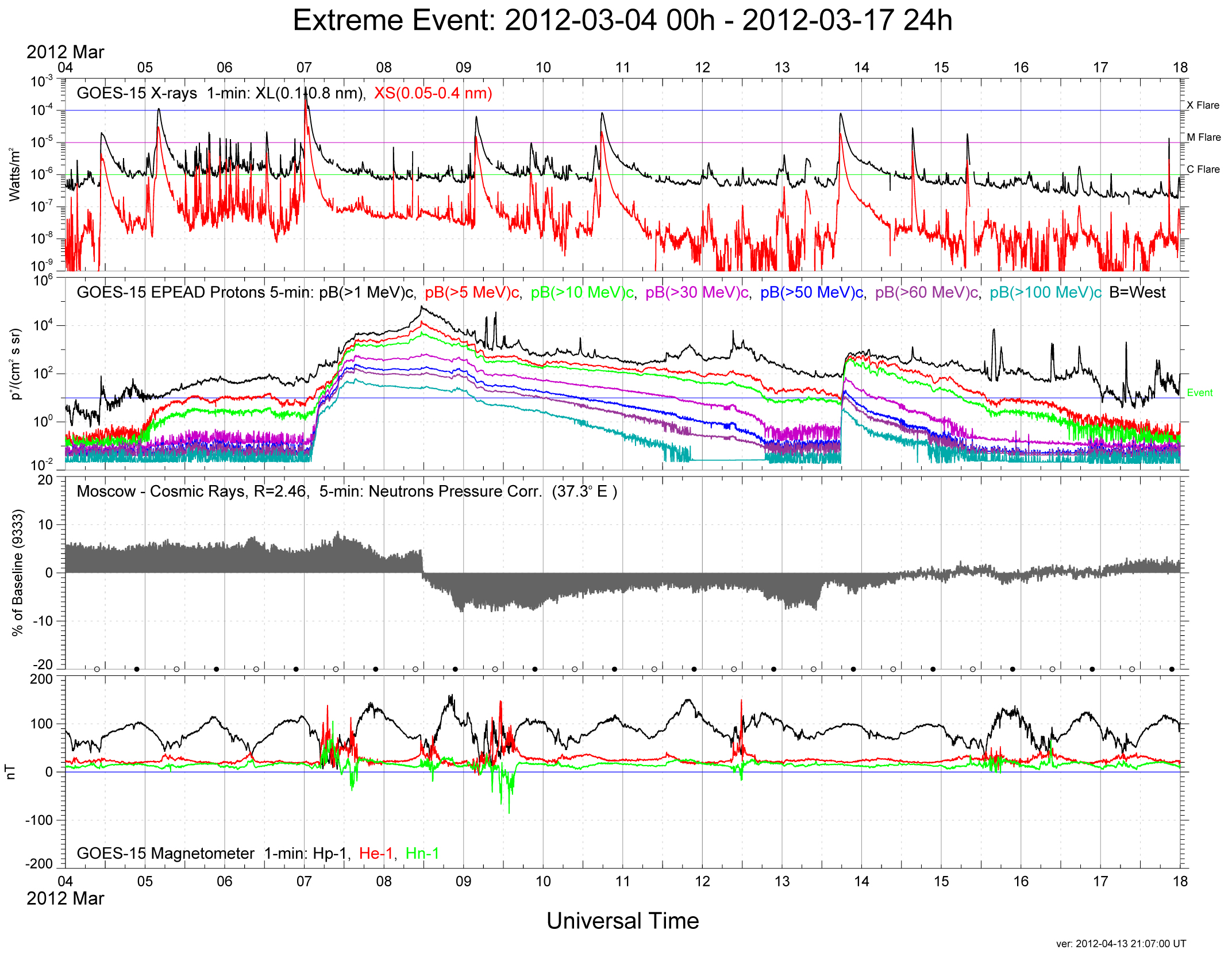
Forbush Decrease in March 2012.

The Forbush decrease is usually observable by particle detectors on Earth within a few days after the CME, and the decrease takes place over the course of a few hours. Over the following several days, the galactic cosmic ray intensity returns to normal. Forbush decreases have also been observed by humans on Mir and the International Space Station (ISS), at other locations in the inner heliosphere such as the Solar Orbiter spacecraft, and at Mars with the Mars Science Laboratory rover's Radiation assessment detector and the MAVEN orbiter, as well as in the outer solar system by instruments onboard Pioneer 10 and 11 and Voyager 1 and 2, even past the orbit of Neptune.

The magnitude of a Forbush decrease depends on three factors:

- the size of the CME
- the strength of the magnetic fields in the CME
- the proximity of the CME to the Earth

A Forbush decrease is sometimes defined as being a decrease of at least 10% of galactic cosmic rays on Earth, but ranges from about 3% to 20%. The amplitude is also highly dependent on the energy of cosmic rays that is observed by the specific instrument, where lower energies typically show larger decreases. Reductions of 30% or more have been recorded aboard the ISS.

The overall rate of Forbush decreases tends to follow the 11-year sunspot cycle. It is more difficult to shield astronauts from galactic cosmic rays than from solar wind, so future astronauts might benefit most from radiation shielding during solar minima, when the suppressive effect of CMEs is less frequent.

== See also ==
- Ionizing radiation
